

249001–249100 

|-bgcolor=#d6d6d6
| 249001 ||  || — || May 11, 2007 || Kitt Peak || Spacewatch || EOS || align=right | 4.2 km || 
|-id=002 bgcolor=#d6d6d6
| 249002 ||  || — || June 21, 2007 || Kitt Peak || Spacewatch || — || align=right | 5.6 km || 
|-id=003 bgcolor=#d6d6d6
| 249003 || 2007 NA || — || July 4, 2007 || Mount Lemmon || Mount Lemmon Survey || — || align=right | 7.7 km || 
|-id=004 bgcolor=#fefefe
| 249004 ||  || — || August 6, 2007 || Socorro || LINEAR || KLI || align=right | 3.0 km || 
|-id=005 bgcolor=#C2FFFF
| 249005 ||  || — || August 9, 2007 || Dauban || Chante-Perdrix Obs. || L4 || align=right | 16 km || 
|-id=006 bgcolor=#FA8072
| 249006 ||  || — || August 8, 2007 || Socorro || LINEAR || — || align=right | 1.2 km || 
|-id=007 bgcolor=#E9E9E9
| 249007 ||  || — || August 13, 2007 || Socorro || LINEAR || MIT || align=right | 3.0 km || 
|-id=008 bgcolor=#E9E9E9
| 249008 || 2007 QJ || — || August 16, 2007 || Bisei SG Center || BATTeRS || — || align=right | 4.9 km || 
|-id=009 bgcolor=#d6d6d6
| 249009 ||  || — || August 21, 2007 || La Sagra || OAM Obs. || — || align=right | 5.8 km || 
|-id=010 bgcolor=#d6d6d6
| 249010 Abdel-Samad ||  ||  || August 26, 2007 || Wildberg || R. Apitzsch || — || align=right | 4.2 km || 
|-id=011 bgcolor=#fefefe
| 249011 ||  || — || September 3, 2007 || Catalina || CSS || ERI || align=right | 2.7 km || 
|-id=012 bgcolor=#d6d6d6
| 249012 ||  || — || September 5, 2007 || Catalina || CSS || — || align=right | 6.4 km || 
|-id=013 bgcolor=#E9E9E9
| 249013 ||  || — || September 9, 2007 || Kitt Peak || Spacewatch || — || align=right | 2.9 km || 
|-id=014 bgcolor=#fefefe
| 249014 ||  || — || September 9, 2007 || Kitt Peak || Spacewatch || SUL || align=right | 2.7 km || 
|-id=015 bgcolor=#fefefe
| 249015 ||  || — || September 11, 2007 || Kitt Peak || Spacewatch || FLO || align=right data-sort-value="0.57" | 570 m || 
|-id=016 bgcolor=#d6d6d6
| 249016 ||  || — || September 11, 2007 || Kitt Peak || Spacewatch || — || align=right | 4.4 km || 
|-id=017 bgcolor=#d6d6d6
| 249017 ||  || — || September 11, 2007 || Purple Mountain || PMO NEO || HIL3:2 || align=right | 6.4 km || 
|-id=018 bgcolor=#fefefe
| 249018 ||  || — || September 15, 2007 || Pla D'Arguines || R. Ferrando || SUL || align=right | 2.6 km || 
|-id=019 bgcolor=#fefefe
| 249019 ||  || — || September 12, 2007 || Catalina || CSS || — || align=right | 1.3 km || 
|-id=020 bgcolor=#d6d6d6
| 249020 ||  || — || September 10, 2007 || Kitt Peak || Spacewatch || — || align=right | 4.2 km || 
|-id=021 bgcolor=#d6d6d6
| 249021 ||  || — || September 10, 2007 || Mount Lemmon || Mount Lemmon Survey || — || align=right | 5.2 km || 
|-id=022 bgcolor=#fefefe
| 249022 ||  || — || September 10, 2007 || Mount Lemmon || Mount Lemmon Survey || FLO || align=right | 1.3 km || 
|-id=023 bgcolor=#fefefe
| 249023 ||  || — || September 10, 2007 || Kitt Peak || Spacewatch || — || align=right | 1.3 km || 
|-id=024 bgcolor=#E9E9E9
| 249024 ||  || — || September 13, 2007 || Catalina || CSS || — || align=right | 3.6 km || 
|-id=025 bgcolor=#fefefe
| 249025 ||  || — || September 12, 2007 || Catalina || CSS || — || align=right | 1.2 km || 
|-id=026 bgcolor=#fefefe
| 249026 ||  || — || September 15, 2007 || Kitt Peak || Spacewatch || — || align=right | 2.5 km || 
|-id=027 bgcolor=#d6d6d6
| 249027 ||  || — || September 13, 2007 || Catalina || CSS || — || align=right | 7.2 km || 
|-id=028 bgcolor=#E9E9E9
| 249028 ||  || — || September 3, 2007 || Catalina || CSS || — || align=right | 3.5 km || 
|-id=029 bgcolor=#fefefe
| 249029 ||  || — || September 18, 2007 || Catalina || CSS || — || align=right | 1.1 km || 
|-id=030 bgcolor=#d6d6d6
| 249030 ||  || — || September 20, 2007 || Catalina || CSS || — || align=right | 5.4 km || 
|-id=031 bgcolor=#fefefe
| 249031 ||  || — || September 26, 2007 || Mount Lemmon || Mount Lemmon Survey || FLO || align=right data-sort-value="0.89" | 890 m || 
|-id=032 bgcolor=#C2FFFF
| 249032 || 2007 TA || — || October 1, 2007 || Eskridge || G. Hug || L4 || align=right | 11 km || 
|-id=033 bgcolor=#d6d6d6
| 249033 ||  || — || October 5, 2007 || Kitt Peak || Spacewatch || HYG || align=right | 4.5 km || 
|-id=034 bgcolor=#d6d6d6
| 249034 ||  || — || October 4, 2007 || Catalina || CSS || HYG || align=right | 4.2 km || 
|-id=035 bgcolor=#d6d6d6
| 249035 ||  || — || October 7, 2007 || Dauban || Chante-Perdrix Obs. || — || align=right | 4.3 km || 
|-id=036 bgcolor=#E9E9E9
| 249036 ||  || — || October 9, 2007 || Altschwendt || W. Ries || — || align=right | 2.6 km || 
|-id=037 bgcolor=#fefefe
| 249037 ||  || — || October 8, 2007 || Kitt Peak || Spacewatch || — || align=right | 1.1 km || 
|-id=038 bgcolor=#fefefe
| 249038 ||  || — || October 8, 2007 || Catalina || CSS || PHO || align=right | 1.6 km || 
|-id=039 bgcolor=#d6d6d6
| 249039 ||  || — || October 7, 2007 || Mount Lemmon || Mount Lemmon Survey || — || align=right | 4.1 km || 
|-id=040 bgcolor=#E9E9E9
| 249040 ||  || — || October 7, 2007 || Mount Lemmon || Mount Lemmon Survey || ADE || align=right | 2.4 km || 
|-id=041 bgcolor=#fefefe
| 249041 ||  || — || October 13, 2007 || Goodricke-Pigott || R. A. Tucker || — || align=right | 1.1 km || 
|-id=042 bgcolor=#fefefe
| 249042 ||  || — || October 15, 2007 || Bisei SG Center || BATTeRS || V || align=right data-sort-value="0.96" | 960 m || 
|-id=043 bgcolor=#E9E9E9
| 249043 ||  || — || October 14, 2007 || Bergisch Gladbach || W. Bickel || NEM || align=right | 2.6 km || 
|-id=044 bgcolor=#fefefe
| 249044 Barrymarshall ||  ||  || October 15, 2007 || Vallemare di Borbona || V. S. Casulli || FLO || align=right | 1.1 km || 
|-id=045 bgcolor=#d6d6d6
| 249045 ||  || — || October 5, 2007 || Kitt Peak || Spacewatch || — || align=right | 4.2 km || 
|-id=046 bgcolor=#fefefe
| 249046 ||  || — || October 8, 2007 || Catalina || CSS || — || align=right data-sort-value="0.94" | 940 m || 
|-id=047 bgcolor=#d6d6d6
| 249047 ||  || — || October 8, 2007 || Mount Lemmon || Mount Lemmon Survey || Tj (2.95) || align=right | 8.5 km || 
|-id=048 bgcolor=#fefefe
| 249048 ||  || — || October 8, 2007 || Catalina || CSS || — || align=right data-sort-value="0.91" | 910 m || 
|-id=049 bgcolor=#fefefe
| 249049 ||  || — || October 6, 2007 || Kitt Peak || Spacewatch || — || align=right | 2.8 km || 
|-id=050 bgcolor=#E9E9E9
| 249050 ||  || — || October 6, 2007 || Kitt Peak || Spacewatch || HOF || align=right | 2.9 km || 
|-id=051 bgcolor=#fefefe
| 249051 ||  || — || October 6, 2007 || Kitt Peak || Spacewatch || FLO || align=right data-sort-value="0.83" | 830 m || 
|-id=052 bgcolor=#d6d6d6
| 249052 ||  || — || October 6, 2007 || Kitt Peak || Spacewatch || — || align=right | 6.8 km || 
|-id=053 bgcolor=#fefefe
| 249053 ||  || — || October 9, 2007 || Catalina || CSS || FLO || align=right | 1.1 km || 
|-id=054 bgcolor=#E9E9E9
| 249054 ||  || — || October 9, 2007 || Mount Lemmon || Mount Lemmon Survey || — || align=right | 2.5 km || 
|-id=055 bgcolor=#E9E9E9
| 249055 ||  || — || October 6, 2007 || Socorro || LINEAR || — || align=right | 3.7 km || 
|-id=056 bgcolor=#E9E9E9
| 249056 ||  || — || October 7, 2007 || Kitt Peak || Spacewatch || HOF || align=right | 3.5 km || 
|-id=057 bgcolor=#d6d6d6
| 249057 ||  || — || October 8, 2007 || Catalina || CSS || — || align=right | 5.0 km || 
|-id=058 bgcolor=#fefefe
| 249058 ||  || — || October 8, 2007 || Catalina || CSS || — || align=right | 1.6 km || 
|-id=059 bgcolor=#E9E9E9
| 249059 ||  || — || October 11, 2007 || Mount Lemmon || Mount Lemmon Survey || HOF || align=right | 2.9 km || 
|-id=060 bgcolor=#d6d6d6
| 249060 ||  || — || October 12, 2007 || Catalina || CSS || 3:2 || align=right | 7.1 km || 
|-id=061 bgcolor=#E9E9E9
| 249061 Antonyberger ||  ||  || October 11, 2007 || Anderson Mesa || L. H. Wasserman || HOF || align=right | 3.3 km || 
|-id=062 bgcolor=#d6d6d6
| 249062 ||  || — || October 14, 2007 || Mount Lemmon || Mount Lemmon Survey || — || align=right | 3.1 km || 
|-id=063 bgcolor=#d6d6d6
| 249063 ||  || — || October 15, 2007 || Catalina || CSS || TEL || align=right | 4.3 km || 
|-id=064 bgcolor=#fefefe
| 249064 ||  || — || October 14, 2007 || Mount Lemmon || Mount Lemmon Survey || — || align=right | 1.1 km || 
|-id=065 bgcolor=#d6d6d6
| 249065 ||  || — || October 15, 2007 || Kitt Peak || Spacewatch || — || align=right | 4.2 km || 
|-id=066 bgcolor=#d6d6d6
| 249066 ||  || — || October 15, 2007 || Kitt Peak || Spacewatch || VER || align=right | 4.7 km || 
|-id=067 bgcolor=#fefefe
| 249067 ||  || — || October 8, 2007 || Mount Lemmon || Mount Lemmon Survey || NYS || align=right | 1.2 km || 
|-id=068 bgcolor=#fefefe
| 249068 ||  || — || October 14, 2007 || Mount Lemmon || Mount Lemmon Survey || — || align=right data-sort-value="0.99" | 990 m || 
|-id=069 bgcolor=#E9E9E9
| 249069 ||  || — || October 16, 2007 || Catalina || CSS || — || align=right | 2.6 km || 
|-id=070 bgcolor=#E9E9E9
| 249070 ||  || — || October 18, 2007 || Kitt Peak || Spacewatch || — || align=right | 3.2 km || 
|-id=071 bgcolor=#fefefe
| 249071 ||  || — || October 30, 2007 || Mount Lemmon || Mount Lemmon Survey || — || align=right | 1.1 km || 
|-id=072 bgcolor=#d6d6d6
| 249072 ||  || — || October 30, 2007 || Kitt Peak || Spacewatch || — || align=right | 4.6 km || 
|-id=073 bgcolor=#d6d6d6
| 249073 ||  || — || October 30, 2007 || Kitt Peak || Spacewatch || — || align=right | 4.5 km || 
|-id=074 bgcolor=#d6d6d6
| 249074 ||  || — || October 30, 2007 || Kitt Peak || Spacewatch || — || align=right | 4.0 km || 
|-id=075 bgcolor=#fefefe
| 249075 ||  || — || October 30, 2007 || Kitt Peak || Spacewatch || — || align=right | 1.3 km || 
|-id=076 bgcolor=#d6d6d6
| 249076 ||  || — || October 31, 2007 || Kitt Peak || Spacewatch || — || align=right | 3.7 km || 
|-id=077 bgcolor=#fefefe
| 249077 ||  || — || October 30, 2007 || Kitt Peak || Spacewatch || NYS || align=right | 1.9 km || 
|-id=078 bgcolor=#fefefe
| 249078 ||  || — || October 20, 2007 || Mount Lemmon || Mount Lemmon Survey || — || align=right | 2.3 km || 
|-id=079 bgcolor=#fefefe
| 249079 ||  || — || November 3, 2007 || La Cañada || J. Lacruz || — || align=right | 1.2 km || 
|-id=080 bgcolor=#d6d6d6
| 249080 ||  || — || November 4, 2007 || La Sagra || OAM Obs. || EUP || align=right | 6.2 km || 
|-id=081 bgcolor=#fefefe
| 249081 ||  || — || November 1, 2007 || Kitt Peak || Spacewatch || — || align=right | 1.3 km || 
|-id=082 bgcolor=#fefefe
| 249082 ||  || — || November 1, 2007 || Kitt Peak || Spacewatch || — || align=right data-sort-value="0.93" | 930 m || 
|-id=083 bgcolor=#E9E9E9
| 249083 ||  || — || November 2, 2007 || Mount Lemmon || Mount Lemmon Survey || — || align=right | 2.5 km || 
|-id=084 bgcolor=#E9E9E9
| 249084 ||  || — || November 2, 2007 || Mount Lemmon || Mount Lemmon Survey || — || align=right | 4.6 km || 
|-id=085 bgcolor=#E9E9E9
| 249085 ||  || — || November 2, 2007 || Kitt Peak || Spacewatch || — || align=right | 4.7 km || 
|-id=086 bgcolor=#d6d6d6
| 249086 ||  || — || November 2, 2007 || Catalina || CSS || — || align=right | 4.4 km || 
|-id=087 bgcolor=#fefefe
| 249087 ||  || — || November 1, 2007 || Kitt Peak || Spacewatch || — || align=right | 1.1 km || 
|-id=088 bgcolor=#fefefe
| 249088 ||  || — || November 1, 2007 || Kitt Peak || Spacewatch || FLO || align=right data-sort-value="0.83" | 830 m || 
|-id=089 bgcolor=#fefefe
| 249089 ||  || — || November 1, 2007 || Kitt Peak || Spacewatch || SVE || align=right | 3.0 km || 
|-id=090 bgcolor=#fefefe
| 249090 ||  || — || November 1, 2007 || Kitt Peak || Spacewatch || — || align=right | 1.0 km || 
|-id=091 bgcolor=#FA8072
| 249091 ||  || — || November 5, 2007 || Socorro || LINEAR || — || align=right | 1.4 km || 
|-id=092 bgcolor=#fefefe
| 249092 ||  || — || November 4, 2007 || Purple Mountain || PMO NEO || — || align=right | 1.4 km || 
|-id=093 bgcolor=#fefefe
| 249093 ||  || — || November 5, 2007 || Kitt Peak || Spacewatch || — || align=right data-sort-value="0.93" | 930 m || 
|-id=094 bgcolor=#E9E9E9
| 249094 ||  || — || November 5, 2007 || Kitt Peak || Spacewatch || — || align=right | 3.3 km || 
|-id=095 bgcolor=#E9E9E9
| 249095 ||  || — || November 5, 2007 || Kitt Peak || Spacewatch || — || align=right | 2.5 km || 
|-id=096 bgcolor=#d6d6d6
| 249096 ||  || — || November 4, 2007 || Mount Lemmon || Mount Lemmon Survey || — || align=right | 3.9 km || 
|-id=097 bgcolor=#fefefe
| 249097 ||  || — || November 5, 2007 || Mount Lemmon || Mount Lemmon Survey || NYS || align=right data-sort-value="0.70" | 700 m || 
|-id=098 bgcolor=#d6d6d6
| 249098 ||  || — || November 7, 2007 || Catalina || CSS || — || align=right | 4.3 km || 
|-id=099 bgcolor=#E9E9E9
| 249099 ||  || — || November 11, 2007 || Lulin Observatory || LUSS || MIS || align=right | 2.9 km || 
|-id=100 bgcolor=#fefefe
| 249100 ||  || — || November 7, 2007 || Catalina || CSS || — || align=right | 1.4 km || 
|}

249101–249200 

|-bgcolor=#d6d6d6
| 249101 ||  || — || November 11, 2007 || Mount Lemmon || Mount Lemmon Survey || — || align=right | 3.9 km || 
|-id=102 bgcolor=#fefefe
| 249102 ||  || — || November 12, 2007 || Catalina || CSS || V || align=right data-sort-value="0.96" | 960 m || 
|-id=103 bgcolor=#FA8072
| 249103 ||  || — || November 15, 2007 || Socorro || LINEAR || — || align=right data-sort-value="0.96" | 960 m || 
|-id=104 bgcolor=#fefefe
| 249104 ||  || — || November 14, 2007 || Kitt Peak || Spacewatch || — || align=right | 1.2 km || 
|-id=105 bgcolor=#E9E9E9
| 249105 ||  || — || November 15, 2007 || Catalina || CSS || PAE || align=right | 4.3 km || 
|-id=106 bgcolor=#fefefe
| 249106 ||  || — || November 15, 2007 || Catalina || CSS || — || align=right | 1.2 km || 
|-id=107 bgcolor=#fefefe
| 249107 ||  || — || November 14, 2007 || Kitt Peak || Spacewatch || MAS || align=right | 1.1 km || 
|-id=108 bgcolor=#d6d6d6
| 249108 ||  || — || November 14, 2007 || Anderson Mesa || LONEOS || — || align=right | 5.3 km || 
|-id=109 bgcolor=#fefefe
| 249109 ||  || — || November 11, 2007 || Mount Lemmon || Mount Lemmon Survey || NYS || align=right data-sort-value="0.92" | 920 m || 
|-id=110 bgcolor=#E9E9E9
| 249110 ||  || — || November 14, 2007 || Kitt Peak || Spacewatch || — || align=right | 2.7 km || 
|-id=111 bgcolor=#d6d6d6
| 249111 ||  || — || November 2, 2007 || Kitt Peak || Spacewatch || — || align=right | 5.0 km || 
|-id=112 bgcolor=#d6d6d6
| 249112 ||  || — || November 4, 2007 || Kitt Peak || Spacewatch || EOS || align=right | 4.2 km || 
|-id=113 bgcolor=#d6d6d6
| 249113 ||  || — || November 6, 2007 || Kitt Peak || Spacewatch || CRO || align=right | 4.2 km || 
|-id=114 bgcolor=#d6d6d6
| 249114 ||  || — || November 8, 2007 || Socorro || LINEAR || EOS || align=right | 4.0 km || 
|-id=115 bgcolor=#fefefe
| 249115 ||  || — || November 12, 2007 || Socorro || LINEAR || — || align=right data-sort-value="0.98" | 980 m || 
|-id=116 bgcolor=#fefefe
| 249116 ||  || — || November 16, 2007 || Mount Lemmon || Mount Lemmon Survey || V || align=right data-sort-value="0.97" | 970 m || 
|-id=117 bgcolor=#E9E9E9
| 249117 ||  || — || November 18, 2007 || Socorro || LINEAR || — || align=right | 4.5 km || 
|-id=118 bgcolor=#fefefe
| 249118 ||  || — || November 17, 2007 || Junk Bond || D. Healy || critical || align=right data-sort-value="0.78" | 780 m || 
|-id=119 bgcolor=#d6d6d6
| 249119 ||  || — || November 18, 2007 || Mount Lemmon || Mount Lemmon Survey || — || align=right | 4.8 km || 
|-id=120 bgcolor=#E9E9E9
| 249120 ||  || — || November 19, 2007 || Kitt Peak || Spacewatch || — || align=right | 2.6 km || 
|-id=121 bgcolor=#fefefe
| 249121 ||  || — || December 12, 2007 || Socorro || LINEAR || FLO || align=right | 1.0 km || 
|-id=122 bgcolor=#E9E9E9
| 249122 ||  || — || December 10, 2007 || Socorro || LINEAR || — || align=right | 2.5 km || 
|-id=123 bgcolor=#d6d6d6
| 249123 ||  || — || December 15, 2007 || Kitt Peak || Spacewatch || ALA || align=right | 4.8 km || 
|-id=124 bgcolor=#E9E9E9
| 249124 ||  || — || December 15, 2007 || Catalina || CSS || — || align=right | 5.8 km || 
|-id=125 bgcolor=#E9E9E9
| 249125 ||  || — || December 14, 2007 || Mount Lemmon || Mount Lemmon Survey || — || align=right | 1.7 km || 
|-id=126 bgcolor=#E9E9E9
| 249126 ||  || — || December 17, 2007 || Mount Lemmon || Mount Lemmon Survey || — || align=right | 3.2 km || 
|-id=127 bgcolor=#d6d6d6
| 249127 ||  || — || December 16, 2007 || Kitt Peak || Spacewatch || — || align=right | 5.3 km || 
|-id=128 bgcolor=#d6d6d6
| 249128 ||  || — || December 17, 2007 || Mount Lemmon || Mount Lemmon Survey || EOS || align=right | 4.3 km || 
|-id=129 bgcolor=#fefefe
| 249129 ||  || — || December 30, 2007 || Dauban || Chante-Perdrix Obs. || ERI || align=right | 2.7 km || 
|-id=130 bgcolor=#E9E9E9
| 249130 ||  || — || December 30, 2007 || Catalina || CSS || ADE || align=right | 3.5 km || 
|-id=131 bgcolor=#E9E9E9
| 249131 ||  || — || December 30, 2007 || Junk Bond || D. Healy || — || align=right | 4.0 km || 
|-id=132 bgcolor=#d6d6d6
| 249132 ||  || — || December 30, 2007 || Catalina || CSS || JLI || align=right | 5.7 km || 
|-id=133 bgcolor=#fefefe
| 249133 ||  || — || December 31, 2007 || Kitt Peak || Spacewatch || NYS || align=right data-sort-value="0.90" | 900 m || 
|-id=134 bgcolor=#fefefe
| 249134 ||  || — || December 18, 2007 || Mount Lemmon || Mount Lemmon Survey || NYS || align=right | 2.2 km || 
|-id=135 bgcolor=#E9E9E9
| 249135 ||  || — || December 18, 2007 || Mount Lemmon || Mount Lemmon Survey || — || align=right | 4.1 km || 
|-id=136 bgcolor=#d6d6d6
| 249136 ||  || — || December 20, 2007 || Mount Lemmon || Mount Lemmon Survey || — || align=right | 5.4 km || 
|-id=137 bgcolor=#d6d6d6
| 249137 ||  || — || January 8, 2008 || Dauban || F. Kugel || — || align=right | 4.3 km || 
|-id=138 bgcolor=#E9E9E9
| 249138 ||  || — || January 9, 2008 || Lulin || LUSS || — || align=right | 4.5 km || 
|-id=139 bgcolor=#d6d6d6
| 249139 ||  || — || January 7, 2008 || Lulin || LUSS || — || align=right | 5.1 km || 
|-id=140 bgcolor=#E9E9E9
| 249140 ||  || — || January 10, 2008 || Mount Lemmon || Mount Lemmon Survey || — || align=right | 2.6 km || 
|-id=141 bgcolor=#d6d6d6
| 249141 ||  || — || January 11, 2008 || Kitt Peak || Spacewatch || — || align=right | 6.4 km || 
|-id=142 bgcolor=#E9E9E9
| 249142 ||  || — || January 10, 2008 || Kitt Peak || Spacewatch || — || align=right | 3.7 km || 
|-id=143 bgcolor=#E9E9E9
| 249143 ||  || — || January 10, 2008 || Mount Lemmon || Mount Lemmon Survey || HOF || align=right | 3.2 km || 
|-id=144 bgcolor=#d6d6d6
| 249144 ||  || — || January 10, 2008 || Kitt Peak || Spacewatch || — || align=right | 5.2 km || 
|-id=145 bgcolor=#E9E9E9
| 249145 ||  || — || January 11, 2008 || Kitt Peak || Spacewatch || — || align=right | 3.3 km || 
|-id=146 bgcolor=#d6d6d6
| 249146 ||  || — || January 11, 2008 || Kitt Peak || Spacewatch || — || align=right | 3.3 km || 
|-id=147 bgcolor=#fefefe
| 249147 ||  || — || January 11, 2008 || Kitt Peak || Spacewatch || NYS || align=right | 1.1 km || 
|-id=148 bgcolor=#d6d6d6
| 249148 ||  || — || January 11, 2008 || Kitt Peak || Spacewatch || — || align=right | 3.8 km || 
|-id=149 bgcolor=#E9E9E9
| 249149 ||  || — || January 11, 2008 || Kitt Peak || Spacewatch || — || align=right | 2.7 km || 
|-id=150 bgcolor=#d6d6d6
| 249150 ||  || — || January 13, 2008 || Mount Lemmon || Mount Lemmon Survey || — || align=right | 5.0 km || 
|-id=151 bgcolor=#d6d6d6
| 249151 ||  || — || January 12, 2008 || Kitt Peak || Spacewatch || — || align=right | 3.7 km || 
|-id=152 bgcolor=#E9E9E9
| 249152 ||  || — || January 12, 2008 || Kitt Peak || Spacewatch || GEF || align=right | 1.7 km || 
|-id=153 bgcolor=#E9E9E9
| 249153 ||  || — || January 14, 2008 || Kitt Peak || Spacewatch || — || align=right | 4.4 km || 
|-id=154 bgcolor=#d6d6d6
| 249154 ||  || — || January 15, 2008 || Kitt Peak || Spacewatch || — || align=right | 4.4 km || 
|-id=155 bgcolor=#d6d6d6
| 249155 ||  || — || January 10, 2008 || Mount Lemmon || Mount Lemmon Survey || — || align=right | 5.2 km || 
|-id=156 bgcolor=#d6d6d6
| 249156 ||  || — || January 12, 2008 || Socorro || LINEAR || EOS || align=right | 5.9 km || 
|-id=157 bgcolor=#d6d6d6
| 249157 ||  || — || January 16, 2008 || Kitt Peak || Spacewatch || — || align=right | 4.1 km || 
|-id=158 bgcolor=#d6d6d6
| 249158 ||  || — || January 16, 2008 || Kitt Peak || Spacewatch || — || align=right | 4.9 km || 
|-id=159 bgcolor=#d6d6d6
| 249159 ||  || — || January 19, 2008 || Mount Lemmon || Mount Lemmon Survey || EOS || align=right | 4.2 km || 
|-id=160 bgcolor=#d6d6d6
| 249160 Urriellu ||  ||  || January 25, 2008 || La Cañada || J. Lacruz || — || align=right | 4.3 km || 
|-id=161 bgcolor=#d6d6d6
| 249161 ||  || — || January 30, 2008 || Mount Lemmon || Mount Lemmon Survey || — || align=right | 4.6 km || 
|-id=162 bgcolor=#d6d6d6
| 249162 ||  || — || January 31, 2008 || Mount Lemmon || Mount Lemmon Survey || — || align=right | 4.7 km || 
|-id=163 bgcolor=#d6d6d6
| 249163 ||  || — || January 30, 2008 || Mount Lemmon || Mount Lemmon Survey || HYG || align=right | 3.6 km || 
|-id=164 bgcolor=#E9E9E9
| 249164 ||  || — || January 30, 2008 || Catalina || CSS || — || align=right | 3.1 km || 
|-id=165 bgcolor=#E9E9E9
| 249165 ||  || — || January 30, 2008 || Kitt Peak || Spacewatch || — || align=right | 2.5 km || 
|-id=166 bgcolor=#E9E9E9
| 249166 ||  || — || January 30, 2008 || Kitt Peak || Spacewatch || — || align=right | 2.3 km || 
|-id=167 bgcolor=#E9E9E9
| 249167 ||  || — || January 30, 2008 || Mount Lemmon || Mount Lemmon Survey || — || align=right | 1.6 km || 
|-id=168 bgcolor=#fefefe
| 249168 ||  || — || January 30, 2008 || Kitt Peak || Spacewatch || NYS || align=right | 1.8 km || 
|-id=169 bgcolor=#d6d6d6
| 249169 ||  || — || February 7, 2008 || Mayhill || A. Lowe || TIR || align=right | 4.8 km || 
|-id=170 bgcolor=#E9E9E9
| 249170 ||  || — || February 3, 2008 || Kitt Peak || Spacewatch || HOF || align=right | 3.0 km || 
|-id=171 bgcolor=#E9E9E9
| 249171 ||  || — || February 1, 2008 || Kitt Peak || Spacewatch || — || align=right | 2.9 km || 
|-id=172 bgcolor=#d6d6d6
| 249172 ||  || — || February 2, 2008 || Mount Lemmon || Mount Lemmon Survey || ALA || align=right | 5.2 km || 
|-id=173 bgcolor=#d6d6d6
| 249173 ||  || — || February 2, 2008 || Catalina || CSS || — || align=right | 5.8 km || 
|-id=174 bgcolor=#E9E9E9
| 249174 ||  || — || February 2, 2008 || Kitt Peak || Spacewatch || — || align=right | 3.3 km || 
|-id=175 bgcolor=#d6d6d6
| 249175 ||  || — || February 6, 2008 || Catalina || CSS || — || align=right | 3.7 km || 
|-id=176 bgcolor=#d6d6d6
| 249176 ||  || — || February 7, 2008 || Kitt Peak || Spacewatch || — || align=right | 3.5 km || 
|-id=177 bgcolor=#fefefe
| 249177 ||  || — || February 8, 2008 || Mount Lemmon || Mount Lemmon Survey || ERI || align=right | 2.1 km || 
|-id=178 bgcolor=#d6d6d6
| 249178 ||  || — || February 9, 2008 || Kitt Peak || Spacewatch || LIX || align=right | 5.6 km || 
|-id=179 bgcolor=#d6d6d6
| 249179 ||  || — || February 9, 2008 || Mount Lemmon || Mount Lemmon Survey || THM || align=right | 2.4 km || 
|-id=180 bgcolor=#C2FFFF
| 249180 ||  || — || February 12, 2008 || Kitt Peak || Spacewatch || L5 || align=right | 15 km || 
|-id=181 bgcolor=#d6d6d6
| 249181 ||  || — || February 11, 2008 || Dauban || F. Kugel || EOS || align=right | 2.7 km || 
|-id=182 bgcolor=#d6d6d6
| 249182 ||  || — || February 14, 2008 || Grove Creek || F. Tozzi || HIL3:2 || align=right | 7.2 km || 
|-id=183 bgcolor=#d6d6d6
| 249183 ||  || — || February 14, 2008 || Grove Creek || F. Tozzi || EUP || align=right | 6.0 km || 
|-id=184 bgcolor=#fefefe
| 249184 ||  || — || February 8, 2008 || Kitt Peak || Spacewatch || — || align=right | 1.0 km || 
|-id=185 bgcolor=#d6d6d6
| 249185 ||  || — || February 8, 2008 || Kitt Peak || Spacewatch || — || align=right | 3.9 km || 
|-id=186 bgcolor=#E9E9E9
| 249186 ||  || — || February 8, 2008 || Mount Lemmon || Mount Lemmon Survey || — || align=right | 2.7 km || 
|-id=187 bgcolor=#E9E9E9
| 249187 ||  || — || February 8, 2008 || Kitt Peak || Spacewatch || EUN || align=right | 2.0 km || 
|-id=188 bgcolor=#d6d6d6
| 249188 ||  || — || February 9, 2008 || Mount Lemmon || Mount Lemmon Survey || — || align=right | 3.2 km || 
|-id=189 bgcolor=#d6d6d6
| 249189 ||  || — || February 9, 2008 || Catalina || CSS || — || align=right | 4.9 km || 
|-id=190 bgcolor=#E9E9E9
| 249190 ||  || — || February 10, 2008 || Mount Lemmon || Mount Lemmon Survey || ADE || align=right | 3.3 km || 
|-id=191 bgcolor=#d6d6d6
| 249191 ||  || — || February 6, 2008 || Catalina || CSS || EUP || align=right | 6.0 km || 
|-id=192 bgcolor=#E9E9E9
| 249192 ||  || — || February 6, 2008 || Mayhill || A. Lowe || EUN || align=right | 1.9 km || 
|-id=193 bgcolor=#d6d6d6
| 249193 ||  || — || February 3, 2008 || Catalina || CSS || TIR || align=right | 3.2 km || 
|-id=194 bgcolor=#d6d6d6
| 249194 ||  || — || February 10, 2008 || Kitt Peak || Spacewatch || 7:4 || align=right | 4.0 km || 
|-id=195 bgcolor=#E9E9E9
| 249195 ||  || — || February 13, 2008 || Kitt Peak || Spacewatch || — || align=right | 2.8 km || 
|-id=196 bgcolor=#d6d6d6
| 249196 ||  || — || February 9, 2008 || Kitt Peak || Spacewatch || — || align=right | 5.2 km || 
|-id=197 bgcolor=#d6d6d6
| 249197 ||  || — || February 1, 2008 || Socorro || LINEAR || EOS || align=right | 3.0 km || 
|-id=198 bgcolor=#d6d6d6
| 249198 ||  || — || February 24, 2008 || Dauban || F. Kugel || — || align=right | 4.1 km || 
|-id=199 bgcolor=#E9E9E9
| 249199 ||  || — || February 25, 2008 || Kitt Peak || Spacewatch || — || align=right | 2.8 km || 
|-id=200 bgcolor=#E9E9E9
| 249200 ||  || — || February 25, 2008 || Kitt Peak || Spacewatch || GEF || align=right | 1.7 km || 
|}

249201–249300 

|-bgcolor=#d6d6d6
| 249201 ||  || — || February 26, 2008 || Mount Lemmon || Mount Lemmon Survey || 628 || align=right | 3.1 km || 
|-id=202 bgcolor=#E9E9E9
| 249202 ||  || — || February 27, 2008 || Anderson Mesa || LONEOS || — || align=right | 3.4 km || 
|-id=203 bgcolor=#E9E9E9
| 249203 ||  || — || February 27, 2008 || Mount Lemmon || Mount Lemmon Survey || PAD || align=right | 3.1 km || 
|-id=204 bgcolor=#fefefe
| 249204 ||  || — || February 27, 2008 || Mount Lemmon || Mount Lemmon Survey || ERI || align=right | 2.9 km || 
|-id=205 bgcolor=#E9E9E9
| 249205 ||  || — || February 27, 2008 || Mount Lemmon || Mount Lemmon Survey || HOF || align=right | 4.0 km || 
|-id=206 bgcolor=#d6d6d6
| 249206 ||  || — || February 28, 2008 || Catalina || CSS || — || align=right | 6.1 km || 
|-id=207 bgcolor=#E9E9E9
| 249207 ||  || — || February 29, 2008 || Catalina || CSS || — || align=right | 4.3 km || 
|-id=208 bgcolor=#d6d6d6
| 249208 ||  || — || February 27, 2008 || Mount Lemmon || Mount Lemmon Survey || — || align=right | 4.2 km || 
|-id=209 bgcolor=#E9E9E9
| 249209 ||  || — || February 27, 2008 || Catalina || CSS || — || align=right | 4.0 km || 
|-id=210 bgcolor=#d6d6d6
| 249210 ||  || — || February 29, 2008 || Kitt Peak || Spacewatch || 7:4 || align=right | 5.2 km || 
|-id=211 bgcolor=#d6d6d6
| 249211 ||  || — || February 27, 2008 || Kitt Peak || Spacewatch || ALA || align=right | 5.1 km || 
|-id=212 bgcolor=#C2FFFF
| 249212 ||  || — || February 18, 2008 || Mount Lemmon || Mount Lemmon Survey || L5 || align=right | 13 km || 
|-id=213 bgcolor=#E9E9E9
| 249213 ||  || — || February 29, 2008 || Kitt Peak || Spacewatch || — || align=right | 3.2 km || 
|-id=214 bgcolor=#d6d6d6
| 249214 || 2008 EC || — || March 1, 2008 || Desert Moon || B. L. Stevens || — || align=right | 3.4 km || 
|-id=215 bgcolor=#d6d6d6
| 249215 ||  || — || March 2, 2008 || Kitt Peak || Spacewatch || — || align=right | 4.1 km || 
|-id=216 bgcolor=#d6d6d6
| 249216 ||  || — || March 7, 2008 || Catalina || CSS || EOS || align=right | 2.8 km || 
|-id=217 bgcolor=#d6d6d6
| 249217 ||  || — || March 9, 2008 || Kitt Peak || Spacewatch || — || align=right | 4.6 km || 
|-id=218 bgcolor=#E9E9E9
| 249218 ||  || — || March 7, 2008 || Mount Lemmon || Mount Lemmon Survey || MIT || align=right | 4.4 km || 
|-id=219 bgcolor=#d6d6d6
| 249219 ||  || — || March 1, 2008 || Catalina || CSS || LUT || align=right | 7.0 km || 
|-id=220 bgcolor=#d6d6d6
| 249220 ||  || — || March 3, 2008 || Catalina || CSS || — || align=right | 4.1 km || 
|-id=221 bgcolor=#d6d6d6
| 249221 ||  || — || March 6, 2008 || Catalina || CSS || ALA || align=right | 8.2 km || 
|-id=222 bgcolor=#d6d6d6
| 249222 ||  || — || March 5, 2008 || Mount Lemmon || Mount Lemmon Survey || — || align=right | 4.0 km || 
|-id=223 bgcolor=#d6d6d6
| 249223 ||  || — || March 6, 2008 || Mount Lemmon || Mount Lemmon Survey || — || align=right | 3.1 km || 
|-id=224 bgcolor=#d6d6d6
| 249224 ||  || — || March 11, 2008 || Kitt Peak || Spacewatch || — || align=right | 5.0 km || 
|-id=225 bgcolor=#C2FFFF
| 249225 ||  || — || March 28, 2008 || Mount Lemmon || Mount Lemmon Survey || L5 || align=right | 12 km || 
|-id=226 bgcolor=#d6d6d6
| 249226 ||  || — || March 30, 2008 || Kitt Peak || Spacewatch || — || align=right | 4.5 km || 
|-id=227 bgcolor=#d6d6d6
| 249227 ||  || — || March 31, 2008 || Mount Lemmon || Mount Lemmon Survey || HYG || align=right | 4.3 km || 
|-id=228 bgcolor=#E9E9E9
| 249228 ||  || — || April 7, 2008 || Grove Creek || F. Tozzi || — || align=right | 5.0 km || 
|-id=229 bgcolor=#d6d6d6
| 249229 ||  || — || April 3, 2008 || Kitt Peak || Spacewatch || — || align=right | 3.6 km || 
|-id=230 bgcolor=#FA8072
| 249230 ||  || — || April 6, 2008 || Catalina || CSS || — || align=right data-sort-value="0.72" | 720 m || 
|-id=231 bgcolor=#d6d6d6
| 249231 ||  || — || April 7, 2008 || Kitt Peak || Spacewatch || — || align=right | 4.1 km || 
|-id=232 bgcolor=#d6d6d6
| 249232 ||  || — || April 6, 2008 || Mount Lemmon || Mount Lemmon Survey || — || align=right | 6.2 km || 
|-id=233 bgcolor=#d6d6d6
| 249233 ||  || — || April 8, 2008 || Kitt Peak || Spacewatch || — || align=right | 3.7 km || 
|-id=234 bgcolor=#d6d6d6
| 249234 ||  || — || April 9, 2008 || Kitt Peak || Spacewatch || ALA || align=right | 5.2 km || 
|-id=235 bgcolor=#d6d6d6
| 249235 ||  || — || April 11, 2008 || Kitt Peak || Spacewatch || LIX || align=right | 6.1 km || 
|-id=236 bgcolor=#C2FFFF
| 249236 ||  || — || April 13, 2008 || Kitt Peak || Spacewatch || L5 || align=right | 9.1 km || 
|-id=237 bgcolor=#C2FFFF
| 249237 ||  || — || April 24, 2008 || Mount Lemmon || Mount Lemmon Survey || L5 || align=right | 13 km || 
|-id=238 bgcolor=#d6d6d6
| 249238 ||  || — || April 26, 2008 || Kitt Peak || Spacewatch || URS || align=right | 4.9 km || 
|-id=239 bgcolor=#d6d6d6
| 249239 ||  || — || April 29, 2008 || Mount Lemmon || Mount Lemmon Survey || — || align=right | 7.5 km || 
|-id=240 bgcolor=#d6d6d6
| 249240 ||  || — || May 13, 2008 || Tiki || N. Teamo || — || align=right | 5.9 km || 
|-id=241 bgcolor=#C2FFFF
| 249241 ||  || — || July 29, 2008 || Kitt Peak || Spacewatch || L4 || align=right | 12 km || 
|-id=242 bgcolor=#fefefe
| 249242 ||  || — || August 7, 2008 || Kitt Peak || Spacewatch || — || align=right | 3.0 km || 
|-id=243 bgcolor=#E9E9E9
| 249243 ||  || — || August 22, 2008 || Kitt Peak || Spacewatch || HOF || align=right | 4.0 km || 
|-id=244 bgcolor=#E9E9E9
| 249244 ||  || — || August 27, 2008 || La Sagra || OAM Obs. || PAD || align=right | 3.2 km || 
|-id=245 bgcolor=#E9E9E9
| 249245 ||  || — || August 24, 2008 || Kitt Peak || Spacewatch || — || align=right | 4.1 km || 
|-id=246 bgcolor=#d6d6d6
| 249246 ||  || — || September 2, 2008 || Kitt Peak || Spacewatch || SHU3:2 || align=right | 5.0 km || 
|-id=247 bgcolor=#C2FFFF
| 249247 ||  || — || September 3, 2008 || Kitt Peak || Spacewatch || L4ERY || align=right | 12 km || 
|-id=248 bgcolor=#d6d6d6
| 249248 ||  || — || September 6, 2008 || Mount Lemmon || Mount Lemmon Survey || — || align=right | 3.5 km || 
|-id=249 bgcolor=#E9E9E9
| 249249 ||  || — || September 6, 2008 || Mount Lemmon || Mount Lemmon Survey || ADEfast? || align=right | 4.1 km || 
|-id=250 bgcolor=#E9E9E9
| 249250 ||  || — || September 5, 2008 || Kitt Peak || Spacewatch || NEM || align=right | 3.1 km || 
|-id=251 bgcolor=#E9E9E9
| 249251 ||  || — || September 9, 2008 || Mount Lemmon || Mount Lemmon Survey || — || align=right | 3.3 km || 
|-id=252 bgcolor=#fefefe
| 249252 ||  || — || September 4, 2008 || Kitt Peak || Spacewatch || CHL || align=right | 2.1 km || 
|-id=253 bgcolor=#d6d6d6
| 249253 ||  || — || September 9, 2008 || Mount Lemmon || Mount Lemmon Survey || — || align=right | 4.1 km || 
|-id=254 bgcolor=#E9E9E9
| 249254 ||  || — || September 22, 2008 || Goodricke-Pigott || R. A. Tucker || DOR || align=right | 3.5 km || 
|-id=255 bgcolor=#E9E9E9
| 249255 ||  || — || September 20, 2008 || Kitt Peak || Spacewatch || HOF || align=right | 5.0 km || 
|-id=256 bgcolor=#C2FFFF
| 249256 ||  || — || September 20, 2008 || Kitt Peak || Spacewatch || L4ERY || align=right | 12 km || 
|-id=257 bgcolor=#E9E9E9
| 249257 ||  || — || September 20, 2008 || Mount Lemmon || Mount Lemmon Survey || — || align=right | 2.9 km || 
|-id=258 bgcolor=#C2FFFF
| 249258 ||  || — || September 20, 2008 || Mount Lemmon || Mount Lemmon Survey || L4 || align=right | 12 km || 
|-id=259 bgcolor=#E9E9E9
| 249259 ||  || — || September 21, 2008 || Mount Lemmon || Mount Lemmon Survey || — || align=right | 3.0 km || 
|-id=260 bgcolor=#E9E9E9
| 249260 ||  || — || September 21, 2008 || Kitt Peak || Spacewatch || — || align=right | 3.6 km || 
|-id=261 bgcolor=#d6d6d6
| 249261 ||  || — || September 22, 2008 || Catalina || CSS || EUP || align=right | 7.1 km || 
|-id=262 bgcolor=#E9E9E9
| 249262 ||  || — || September 23, 2008 || Mount Lemmon || Mount Lemmon Survey || HOF || align=right | 3.0 km || 
|-id=263 bgcolor=#d6d6d6
| 249263 ||  || — || September 25, 2008 || Sierra Stars || F. Tozzi || — || align=right | 4.9 km || 
|-id=264 bgcolor=#E9E9E9
| 249264 ||  || — || September 21, 2008 || Kitt Peak || Spacewatch || — || align=right | 3.4 km || 
|-id=265 bgcolor=#d6d6d6
| 249265 ||  || — || September 21, 2008 || Mount Lemmon || Mount Lemmon Survey || — || align=right | 3.9 km || 
|-id=266 bgcolor=#d6d6d6
| 249266 ||  || — || September 22, 2008 || Kitt Peak || Spacewatch || 3:2 || align=right | 4.8 km || 
|-id=267 bgcolor=#E9E9E9
| 249267 ||  || — || September 22, 2008 || Kitt Peak || Spacewatch || HOF || align=right | 3.4 km || 
|-id=268 bgcolor=#d6d6d6
| 249268 ||  || — || September 22, 2008 || Kitt Peak || Spacewatch || — || align=right | 4.0 km || 
|-id=269 bgcolor=#d6d6d6
| 249269 ||  || — || September 24, 2008 || Socorro || LINEAR || — || align=right | 4.2 km || 
|-id=270 bgcolor=#d6d6d6
| 249270 ||  || — || September 28, 2008 || Socorro || LINEAR || — || align=right | 5.7 km || 
|-id=271 bgcolor=#d6d6d6
| 249271 ||  || — || September 24, 2008 || Kitt Peak || Spacewatch || URS || align=right | 4.6 km || 
|-id=272 bgcolor=#d6d6d6
| 249272 ||  || — || September 25, 2008 || Kitt Peak || Spacewatch || HYG || align=right | 4.0 km || 
|-id=273 bgcolor=#d6d6d6
| 249273 ||  || — || September 25, 2008 || Kitt Peak || Spacewatch || VER || align=right | 3.4 km || 
|-id=274 bgcolor=#d6d6d6
| 249274 ||  || — || September 25, 2008 || Kitt Peak || Spacewatch || — || align=right | 4.7 km || 
|-id=275 bgcolor=#d6d6d6
| 249275 ||  || — || September 26, 2008 || Kitt Peak || Spacewatch || SHU3:2 || align=right | 6.4 km || 
|-id=276 bgcolor=#d6d6d6
| 249276 ||  || — || September 26, 2008 || Kitt Peak || Spacewatch || VER || align=right | 4.7 km || 
|-id=277 bgcolor=#E9E9E9
| 249277 ||  || — || September 26, 2008 || Kitt Peak || Spacewatch || NEM || align=right | 3.1 km || 
|-id=278 bgcolor=#d6d6d6
| 249278 ||  || — || September 23, 2008 || Kitt Peak || Spacewatch || — || align=right | 2.8 km || 
|-id=279 bgcolor=#d6d6d6
| 249279 ||  || — || September 24, 2008 || Kitt Peak || Spacewatch || — || align=right | 3.4 km || 
|-id=280 bgcolor=#d6d6d6
| 249280 ||  || — || September 23, 2008 || Kitt Peak || Spacewatch || — || align=right | 3.2 km || 
|-id=281 bgcolor=#E9E9E9
| 249281 ||  || — || September 24, 2008 || Kitt Peak || Spacewatch || PAD || align=right | 3.2 km || 
|-id=282 bgcolor=#d6d6d6
| 249282 ||  || — || September 23, 2008 || Catalina || CSS || FIR || align=right | 5.3 km || 
|-id=283 bgcolor=#d6d6d6
| 249283 ||  || — || September 22, 2008 || Kitt Peak || Spacewatch || — || align=right | 2.7 km || 
|-id=284 bgcolor=#d6d6d6
| 249284 ||  || — || September 22, 2008 || Kitt Peak || Spacewatch || SHU3:2 || align=right | 6.5 km || 
|-id=285 bgcolor=#fefefe
| 249285 ||  || — || September 24, 2008 || Kitt Peak || Spacewatch || — || align=right | 1.5 km || 
|-id=286 bgcolor=#E9E9E9
| 249286 ||  || — || October 1, 2008 || La Sagra || OAM Obs. || — || align=right | 2.9 km || 
|-id=287 bgcolor=#E9E9E9
| 249287 ||  || — || October 8, 2008 || Catalina || CSS || — || align=right | 4.7 km || 
|-id=288 bgcolor=#d6d6d6
| 249288 ||  || — || October 1, 2008 || Kitt Peak || Spacewatch || HYG || align=right | 3.2 km || 
|-id=289 bgcolor=#d6d6d6
| 249289 ||  || — || October 2, 2008 || Kitt Peak || Spacewatch || — || align=right | 3.8 km || 
|-id=290 bgcolor=#d6d6d6
| 249290 ||  || — || October 2, 2008 || Catalina || CSS || — || align=right | 6.2 km || 
|-id=291 bgcolor=#d6d6d6
| 249291 ||  || — || October 2, 2008 || Kitt Peak || Spacewatch || — || align=right | 2.7 km || 
|-id=292 bgcolor=#fefefe
| 249292 ||  || — || October 6, 2008 || Kitt Peak || Spacewatch || — || align=right | 1.8 km || 
|-id=293 bgcolor=#d6d6d6
| 249293 ||  || — || October 6, 2008 || Catalina || CSS || LIX || align=right | 5.7 km || 
|-id=294 bgcolor=#d6d6d6
| 249294 ||  || — || October 6, 2008 || Kitt Peak || Spacewatch || — || align=right | 7.0 km || 
|-id=295 bgcolor=#d6d6d6
| 249295 ||  || — || October 7, 2008 || Kitt Peak || Spacewatch || HYG || align=right | 4.3 km || 
|-id=296 bgcolor=#E9E9E9
| 249296 ||  || — || October 8, 2008 || Mount Lemmon || Mount Lemmon Survey || — || align=right | 2.8 km || 
|-id=297 bgcolor=#d6d6d6
| 249297 ||  || — || October 7, 2008 || Mount Lemmon || Mount Lemmon Survey || — || align=right | 5.2 km || 
|-id=298 bgcolor=#d6d6d6
| 249298 ||  || — || October 9, 2008 || Mount Lemmon || Mount Lemmon Survey || — || align=right | 2.7 km || 
|-id=299 bgcolor=#d6d6d6
| 249299 ||  || — || October 7, 2008 || Catalina || CSS || EMA || align=right | 4.5 km || 
|-id=300 bgcolor=#E9E9E9
| 249300 Karenmortfield || 2008 UY ||  || October 18, 2008 || Auberry || Sierra Remote Obs. || — || align=right | 2.4 km || 
|}

249301–249400 

|-bgcolor=#d6d6d6
| 249301 ||  || — || October 24, 2008 || Needville || J. Dellinger || — || align=right | 4.2 km || 
|-id=302 bgcolor=#d6d6d6
| 249302 Ajoie ||  ||  || October 26, 2008 || Vicques || M. Ory || Tj (2.98) || align=right | 7.0 km || 
|-id=303 bgcolor=#fefefe
| 249303 ||  || — || October 20, 2008 || Kitt Peak || Spacewatch || — || align=right | 1.5 km || 
|-id=304 bgcolor=#d6d6d6
| 249304 ||  || — || October 20, 2008 || Kitt Peak || Spacewatch || — || align=right | 4.3 km || 
|-id=305 bgcolor=#E9E9E9
| 249305 ||  || — || October 21, 2008 || Kitt Peak || Spacewatch || — || align=right | 3.1 km || 
|-id=306 bgcolor=#fefefe
| 249306 ||  || — || October 21, 2008 || Kitt Peak || Spacewatch || FLO || align=right | 1.8 km || 
|-id=307 bgcolor=#d6d6d6
| 249307 ||  || — || October 21, 2008 || Mount Lemmon || Mount Lemmon Survey || — || align=right | 5.1 km || 
|-id=308 bgcolor=#fefefe
| 249308 ||  || — || October 21, 2008 || Kitt Peak || Spacewatch || — || align=right | 2.1 km || 
|-id=309 bgcolor=#d6d6d6
| 249309 ||  || — || October 22, 2008 || Mount Lemmon || Mount Lemmon Survey || HYG || align=right | 2.9 km || 
|-id=310 bgcolor=#d6d6d6
| 249310 ||  || — || October 22, 2008 || Kitt Peak || Spacewatch || — || align=right | 5.6 km || 
|-id=311 bgcolor=#d6d6d6
| 249311 ||  || — || October 22, 2008 || Kitt Peak || Spacewatch || 7:4 || align=right | 5.7 km || 
|-id=312 bgcolor=#E9E9E9
| 249312 ||  || — || October 24, 2008 || Kitt Peak || Spacewatch || — || align=right | 4.0 km || 
|-id=313 bgcolor=#d6d6d6
| 249313 ||  || — || October 24, 2008 || Kitt Peak || Spacewatch || — || align=right | 5.1 km || 
|-id=314 bgcolor=#d6d6d6
| 249314 ||  || — || October 24, 2008 || Kitt Peak || Spacewatch || — || align=right | 3.1 km || 
|-id=315 bgcolor=#d6d6d6
| 249315 ||  || — || October 24, 2008 || Kitt Peak || Spacewatch || — || align=right | 5.0 km || 
|-id=316 bgcolor=#d6d6d6
| 249316 ||  || — || October 24, 2008 || Kitt Peak || Spacewatch || — || align=right | 3.5 km || 
|-id=317 bgcolor=#E9E9E9
| 249317 ||  || — || October 28, 2008 || Socorro || LINEAR || — || align=right | 3.6 km || 
|-id=318 bgcolor=#E9E9E9
| 249318 ||  || — || October 28, 2008 || Socorro || LINEAR || — || align=right | 3.0 km || 
|-id=319 bgcolor=#d6d6d6
| 249319 ||  || — || October 28, 2008 || Socorro || LINEAR || — || align=right | 4.7 km || 
|-id=320 bgcolor=#d6d6d6
| 249320 ||  || — || October 27, 2008 || Socorro || LINEAR || — || align=right | 5.3 km || 
|-id=321 bgcolor=#d6d6d6
| 249321 ||  || — || October 24, 2008 || Catalina || CSS || — || align=right | 3.9 km || 
|-id=322 bgcolor=#d6d6d6
| 249322 ||  || — || October 25, 2008 || Kitt Peak || Spacewatch || — || align=right | 6.8 km || 
|-id=323 bgcolor=#d6d6d6
| 249323 ||  || — || October 25, 2008 || Kitt Peak || Spacewatch || — || align=right | 5.7 km || 
|-id=324 bgcolor=#d6d6d6
| 249324 ||  || — || October 27, 2008 || Kitt Peak || Spacewatch || SHU3:2 || align=right | 5.7 km || 
|-id=325 bgcolor=#E9E9E9
| 249325 ||  || — || October 28, 2008 || Kitt Peak || Spacewatch || — || align=right | 2.5 km || 
|-id=326 bgcolor=#d6d6d6
| 249326 ||  || — || October 30, 2008 || Mount Lemmon || Mount Lemmon Survey || TRE || align=right | 3.8 km || 
|-id=327 bgcolor=#d6d6d6
| 249327 ||  || — || October 30, 2008 || Kitt Peak || Spacewatch || — || align=right | 5.1 km || 
|-id=328 bgcolor=#d6d6d6
| 249328 ||  || — || October 31, 2008 || Kitt Peak || Spacewatch || HYG || align=right | 4.2 km || 
|-id=329 bgcolor=#d6d6d6
| 249329 ||  || — || October 24, 2008 || Kitt Peak || Spacewatch || — || align=right | 4.2 km || 
|-id=330 bgcolor=#d6d6d6
| 249330 ||  || — || October 24, 2008 || Mount Lemmon || Mount Lemmon Survey || URS || align=right | 3.2 km || 
|-id=331 bgcolor=#d6d6d6
| 249331 ||  || — || October 31, 2008 || Kitt Peak || Spacewatch || — || align=right | 3.4 km || 
|-id=332 bgcolor=#d6d6d6
| 249332 ||  || — || October 27, 2008 || Mount Lemmon || Mount Lemmon Survey || — || align=right | 5.2 km || 
|-id=333 bgcolor=#d6d6d6
| 249333 ||  || — || October 27, 2008 || Mount Lemmon || Mount Lemmon Survey || — || align=right | 3.7 km || 
|-id=334 bgcolor=#d6d6d6
| 249334 ||  || — || October 30, 2008 || Catalina || CSS || — || align=right | 3.8 km || 
|-id=335 bgcolor=#d6d6d6
| 249335 ||  || — || November 2, 2008 || Socorro || LINEAR || — || align=right | 5.1 km || 
|-id=336 bgcolor=#E9E9E9
| 249336 ||  || — || November 2, 2008 || Socorro || LINEAR || — || align=right | 4.6 km || 
|-id=337 bgcolor=#d6d6d6
| 249337 ||  || — || November 3, 2008 || Socorro || LINEAR || URS || align=right | 6.1 km || 
|-id=338 bgcolor=#d6d6d6
| 249338 ||  || — || November 1, 2008 || Kitt Peak || Spacewatch || SYL7:4 || align=right | 7.7 km || 
|-id=339 bgcolor=#d6d6d6
| 249339 ||  || — || November 9, 2008 || La Sagra || OAM Obs. || — || align=right | 6.9 km || 
|-id=340 bgcolor=#d6d6d6
| 249340 ||  || — || November 7, 2008 || Catalina || CSS || — || align=right | 6.6 km || 
|-id=341 bgcolor=#d6d6d6
| 249341 ||  || — || November 17, 2008 || Kitt Peak || Spacewatch || — || align=right | 4.2 km || 
|-id=342 bgcolor=#d6d6d6
| 249342 ||  || — || November 18, 2008 || Catalina || CSS || — || align=right | 4.1 km || 
|-id=343 bgcolor=#d6d6d6
| 249343 ||  || — || November 20, 2008 || Mayhill || A. Lowe || — || align=right | 5.8 km || 
|-id=344 bgcolor=#E9E9E9
| 249344 ||  || — || November 19, 2008 || Socorro || LINEAR || — || align=right | 3.8 km || 
|-id=345 bgcolor=#fefefe
| 249345 ||  || — || November 22, 2008 || La Sagra || OAM Obs. || — || align=right | 2.2 km || 
|-id=346 bgcolor=#E9E9E9
| 249346 ||  || — || November 22, 2008 || La Sagra || OAM Obs. || — || align=right | 4.8 km || 
|-id=347 bgcolor=#d6d6d6
| 249347 ||  || — || November 18, 2008 || Catalina || CSS || — || align=right | 6.4 km || 
|-id=348 bgcolor=#d6d6d6
| 249348 ||  || — || November 19, 2008 || Catalina || CSS || ALA || align=right | 5.8 km || 
|-id=349 bgcolor=#fefefe
| 249349 ||  || — || November 30, 2008 || Socorro || LINEAR || — || align=right | 3.1 km || 
|-id=350 bgcolor=#d6d6d6
| 249350 ||  || — || November 30, 2008 || Kitt Peak || Spacewatch || HYG || align=right | 6.4 km || 
|-id=351 bgcolor=#d6d6d6
| 249351 ||  || — || November 17, 2008 || Kitt Peak || Spacewatch || URS || align=right | 7.8 km || 
|-id=352 bgcolor=#E9E9E9
| 249352 ||  || — || December 2, 2008 || Socorro || LINEAR || — || align=right | 4.3 km || 
|-id=353 bgcolor=#d6d6d6
| 249353 ||  || — || December 21, 2008 || Dauban || F. Kugel || — || align=right | 4.9 km || 
|-id=354 bgcolor=#d6d6d6
| 249354 ||  || — || December 22, 2008 || Bisei SG Center || BATTeRS || — || align=right | 3.2 km || 
|-id=355 bgcolor=#d6d6d6
| 249355 ||  || — || December 30, 2008 || Mayhill || A. Lowe || — || align=right | 4.3 km || 
|-id=356 bgcolor=#fefefe
| 249356 ||  || — || December 30, 2008 || Bisei SG Center || BATTeRS || PHO || align=right | 2.2 km || 
|-id=357 bgcolor=#fefefe
| 249357 ||  || — || December 31, 2008 || Catalina || CSS || — || align=right | 1.6 km || 
|-id=358 bgcolor=#fefefe
| 249358 ||  || — || December 22, 2008 || Kitt Peak || Spacewatch || NYS || align=right | 1.6 km || 
|-id=359 bgcolor=#E9E9E9
| 249359 ||  || — || December 29, 2008 || Kitt Peak || Spacewatch || — || align=right | 3.0 km || 
|-id=360 bgcolor=#E9E9E9
| 249360 ||  || — || December 30, 2008 || Mount Lemmon || Mount Lemmon Survey || — || align=right | 3.8 km || 
|-id=361 bgcolor=#E9E9E9
| 249361 ||  || — || December 29, 2008 || Kitt Peak || Spacewatch || — || align=right | 3.2 km || 
|-id=362 bgcolor=#d6d6d6
| 249362 ||  || — || December 30, 2008 || Mount Lemmon || Mount Lemmon Survey || EOS || align=right | 3.7 km || 
|-id=363 bgcolor=#E9E9E9
| 249363 ||  || — || December 30, 2008 || Kitt Peak || Spacewatch || — || align=right | 2.8 km || 
|-id=364 bgcolor=#E9E9E9
| 249364 ||  || — || December 21, 2008 || Kitt Peak || Spacewatch || — || align=right | 2.3 km || 
|-id=365 bgcolor=#E9E9E9
| 249365 ||  || — || December 30, 2008 || Mount Lemmon || Mount Lemmon Survey || HOF || align=right | 4.6 km || 
|-id=366 bgcolor=#E9E9E9
| 249366 ||  || — || December 21, 2008 || Mount Lemmon || Mount Lemmon Survey || — || align=right | 3.3 km || 
|-id=367 bgcolor=#fefefe
| 249367 ||  || — || December 22, 2008 || Kitt Peak || Spacewatch || FLO || align=right data-sort-value="0.84" | 840 m || 
|-id=368 bgcolor=#d6d6d6
| 249368 ||  || — || January 4, 2009 || Farra d'Isonzo || Farra d'Isonzo || — || align=right | 4.3 km || 
|-id=369 bgcolor=#E9E9E9
| 249369 ||  || — || January 1, 2009 || Mount Lemmon || Mount Lemmon Survey || EUN || align=right | 2.8 km || 
|-id=370 bgcolor=#fefefe
| 249370 ||  || — || January 3, 2009 || Mount Lemmon || Mount Lemmon Survey || — || align=right | 1.3 km || 
|-id=371 bgcolor=#fefefe
| 249371 ||  || — || January 15, 2009 || Kitt Peak || Spacewatch || — || align=right | 1.1 km || 
|-id=372 bgcolor=#d6d6d6
| 249372 ||  || — || January 18, 2009 || Mayhill || A. Lowe || — || align=right | 5.6 km || 
|-id=373 bgcolor=#fefefe
| 249373 ||  || — || January 18, 2009 || Mayhill || A. Lowe || — || align=right | 1.2 km || 
|-id=374 bgcolor=#d6d6d6
| 249374 ||  || — || January 18, 2009 || Socorro || LINEAR || EUP || align=right | 7.7 km || 
|-id=375 bgcolor=#E9E9E9
| 249375 ||  || — || January 18, 2009 || Socorro || LINEAR || — || align=right | 3.2 km || 
|-id=376 bgcolor=#fefefe
| 249376 ||  || — || January 18, 2009 || Socorro || LINEAR || FLO || align=right data-sort-value="0.85" | 850 m || 
|-id=377 bgcolor=#d6d6d6
| 249377 ||  || — || January 25, 2009 || Mayhill || A. Lowe || — || align=right | 4.4 km || 
|-id=378 bgcolor=#fefefe
| 249378 ||  || — || January 16, 2009 || Mount Lemmon || Mount Lemmon Survey || NYS || align=right | 2.0 km || 
|-id=379 bgcolor=#E9E9E9
| 249379 ||  || — || January 16, 2009 || Kitt Peak || Spacewatch || HOF || align=right | 2.6 km || 
|-id=380 bgcolor=#fefefe
| 249380 ||  || — || January 16, 2009 || Kitt Peak || Spacewatch || ERI || align=right | 2.1 km || 
|-id=381 bgcolor=#E9E9E9
| 249381 ||  || — || January 16, 2009 || Kitt Peak || Spacewatch || — || align=right | 3.5 km || 
|-id=382 bgcolor=#fefefe
| 249382 ||  || — || January 16, 2009 || Mount Lemmon || Mount Lemmon Survey || — || align=right data-sort-value="0.99" | 990 m || 
|-id=383 bgcolor=#d6d6d6
| 249383 ||  || — || January 20, 2009 || Kitt Peak || Spacewatch || VER || align=right | 3.8 km || 
|-id=384 bgcolor=#fefefe
| 249384 ||  || — || January 20, 2009 || Kitt Peak || Spacewatch || V || align=right data-sort-value="0.83" | 830 m || 
|-id=385 bgcolor=#E9E9E9
| 249385 ||  || — || January 25, 2009 || Kitt Peak || Spacewatch || GER || align=right | 3.1 km || 
|-id=386 bgcolor=#d6d6d6
| 249386 ||  || — || January 24, 2009 || Purple Mountain || PMO NEO || EUP || align=right | 6.1 km || 
|-id=387 bgcolor=#fefefe
| 249387 ||  || — || January 26, 2009 || Purple Mountain || PMO NEO || PHO || align=right | 1.9 km || 
|-id=388 bgcolor=#fefefe
| 249388 ||  || — || January 25, 2009 || Kitt Peak || Spacewatch || — || align=right | 1.7 km || 
|-id=389 bgcolor=#E9E9E9
| 249389 ||  || — || January 25, 2009 || Kitt Peak || Spacewatch || HOF || align=right | 3.5 km || 
|-id=390 bgcolor=#E9E9E9
| 249390 ||  || — || January 24, 2009 || Purple Mountain || PMO NEO || JUN || align=right | 3.3 km || 
|-id=391 bgcolor=#d6d6d6
| 249391 ||  || — || January 29, 2009 || Mount Lemmon || Mount Lemmon Survey || 3:2 || align=right | 6.4 km || 
|-id=392 bgcolor=#d6d6d6
| 249392 ||  || — || January 31, 2009 || Mount Lemmon || Mount Lemmon Survey || — || align=right | 3.6 km || 
|-id=393 bgcolor=#E9E9E9
| 249393 ||  || — || January 26, 2009 || Kitt Peak || Spacewatch || — || align=right | 1.8 km || 
|-id=394 bgcolor=#d6d6d6
| 249394 ||  || — || January 27, 2009 || Piszkéstető || K. Sárneczky || — || align=right | 4.4 km || 
|-id=395 bgcolor=#d6d6d6
| 249395 ||  || — || January 30, 2009 || Mount Lemmon || Mount Lemmon Survey || THM || align=right | 3.8 km || 
|-id=396 bgcolor=#d6d6d6
| 249396 ||  || — || January 31, 2009 || Kitt Peak || Spacewatch || — || align=right | 5.7 km || 
|-id=397 bgcolor=#d6d6d6
| 249397 ||  || — || January 31, 2009 || Kitt Peak || Spacewatch || 7:4 || align=right | 6.3 km || 
|-id=398 bgcolor=#fefefe
| 249398 ||  || — || January 27, 2009 || Purple Mountain || PMO NEO || — || align=right | 1.1 km || 
|-id=399 bgcolor=#E9E9E9
| 249399 ||  || — || January 30, 2009 || Mount Lemmon || Mount Lemmon Survey || MAR || align=right | 1.9 km || 
|-id=400 bgcolor=#d6d6d6
| 249400 ||  || — || January 20, 2009 || Catalina || CSS || — || align=right | 5.1 km || 
|}

249401–249500 

|-bgcolor=#fefefe
| 249401 ||  || — || January 25, 2009 || Kitt Peak || Spacewatch || NYS || align=right data-sort-value="0.96" | 960 m || 
|-id=402 bgcolor=#d6d6d6
| 249402 ||  || — || February 1, 2009 || Mount Lemmon || Mount Lemmon Survey || — || align=right | 5.2 km || 
|-id=403 bgcolor=#fefefe
| 249403 ||  || — || February 3, 2009 || Kitt Peak || Spacewatch || FLO || align=right data-sort-value="0.91" | 910 m || 
|-id=404 bgcolor=#d6d6d6
| 249404 ||  || — || February 1, 2009 || Kitt Peak || Spacewatch || — || align=right | 4.6 km || 
|-id=405 bgcolor=#E9E9E9
| 249405 ||  || — || February 13, 2009 || Kitt Peak || Spacewatch || — || align=right | 2.4 km || 
|-id=406 bgcolor=#E9E9E9
| 249406 ||  || — || February 2, 2009 || Siding Spring || SSS || — || align=right | 4.3 km || 
|-id=407 bgcolor=#d6d6d6
| 249407 ||  || — || February 5, 2009 || Catalina || CSS || — || align=right | 6.5 km || 
|-id=408 bgcolor=#E9E9E9
| 249408 ||  || — || February 5, 2009 || Mount Lemmon || Mount Lemmon Survey || — || align=right | 3.3 km || 
|-id=409 bgcolor=#fefefe
| 249409 ||  || — || February 3, 2009 || Kitt Peak || Spacewatch || — || align=right | 1.1 km || 
|-id=410 bgcolor=#d6d6d6
| 249410 ||  || — || February 16, 2009 || Catalina || CSS || — || align=right | 5.4 km || 
|-id=411 bgcolor=#d6d6d6
| 249411 ||  || — || February 17, 2009 || Kitt Peak || Spacewatch || — || align=right | 4.5 km || 
|-id=412 bgcolor=#d6d6d6
| 249412 ||  || — || February 20, 2009 || Catalina || CSS || EUP || align=right | 5.8 km || 
|-id=413 bgcolor=#E9E9E9
| 249413 ||  || — || February 20, 2009 || Kitt Peak || Spacewatch || — || align=right | 1.7 km || 
|-id=414 bgcolor=#d6d6d6
| 249414 ||  || — || February 28, 2009 || Socorro || LINEAR || EUP || align=right | 6.3 km || 
|-id=415 bgcolor=#E9E9E9
| 249415 ||  || — || February 26, 2009 || Catalina || CSS || — || align=right | 1.4 km || 
|-id=416 bgcolor=#d6d6d6
| 249416 ||  || — || February 26, 2009 || Catalina || CSS || 3:2 || align=right | 12 km || 
|-id=417 bgcolor=#fefefe
| 249417 ||  || — || February 26, 2009 || Catalina || CSS || SUL || align=right | 2.7 km || 
|-id=418 bgcolor=#E9E9E9
| 249418 ||  || — || February 26, 2009 || Mount Lemmon || Mount Lemmon Survey || DOR || align=right | 3.8 km || 
|-id=419 bgcolor=#fefefe
| 249419 ||  || — || February 26, 2009 || Kitt Peak || Spacewatch || — || align=right | 1.1 km || 
|-id=420 bgcolor=#fefefe
| 249420 ||  || — || February 19, 2009 || Catalina || CSS || — || align=right | 1.4 km || 
|-id=421 bgcolor=#fefefe
| 249421 ||  || — || February 27, 2009 || Kitt Peak || Spacewatch || — || align=right | 1.6 km || 
|-id=422 bgcolor=#d6d6d6
| 249422 ||  || — || February 27, 2009 || Kitt Peak || Spacewatch || — || align=right | 1.9 km || 
|-id=423 bgcolor=#d6d6d6
| 249423 ||  || — || February 19, 2009 || Kitt Peak || Spacewatch || — || align=right | 5.2 km || 
|-id=424 bgcolor=#E9E9E9
| 249424 ||  || — || February 19, 2009 || Mount Lemmon || Mount Lemmon Survey || — || align=right | 3.9 km || 
|-id=425 bgcolor=#fefefe
| 249425 ||  || — || March 14, 2009 || La Sagra || OAM Obs. || — || align=right data-sort-value="0.93" | 930 m || 
|-id=426 bgcolor=#fefefe
| 249426 ||  || — || March 15, 2009 || La Sagra || OAM Obs. || V || align=right | 1.0 km || 
|-id=427 bgcolor=#fefefe
| 249427 ||  || — || March 15, 2009 || Kitt Peak || Spacewatch || CLA || align=right | 2.2 km || 
|-id=428 bgcolor=#d6d6d6
| 249428 ||  || — || March 2, 2009 || Mount Lemmon || Mount Lemmon Survey || SYL7:4 || align=right | 6.0 km || 
|-id=429 bgcolor=#d6d6d6
| 249429 ||  || — || March 7, 2009 || Mount Lemmon || Mount Lemmon Survey || — || align=right | 3.9 km || 
|-id=430 bgcolor=#fefefe
| 249430 ||  || — || March 1, 2009 || Kitt Peak || Spacewatch || — || align=right | 1.2 km || 
|-id=431 bgcolor=#E9E9E9
| 249431 ||  || — || March 2, 2009 || Mount Lemmon || Mount Lemmon Survey || — || align=right | 4.1 km || 
|-id=432 bgcolor=#fefefe
| 249432 ||  || — || March 18, 2009 || La Cañada || J. Lacruz || — || align=right | 1.1 km || 
|-id=433 bgcolor=#E9E9E9
| 249433 ||  || — || March 16, 2009 || Kitt Peak || Spacewatch || HOF || align=right | 3.4 km || 
|-id=434 bgcolor=#d6d6d6
| 249434 ||  || — || March 19, 2009 || Kitt Peak || Spacewatch || EUP || align=right | 7.8 km || 
|-id=435 bgcolor=#d6d6d6
| 249435 ||  || — || March 19, 2009 || Socorro || LINEAR || EUP || align=right | 5.7 km || 
|-id=436 bgcolor=#d6d6d6
| 249436 ||  || — || March 25, 2009 || La Sagra || OAM Obs. || — || align=right | 5.7 km || 
|-id=437 bgcolor=#E9E9E9
| 249437 ||  || — || March 29, 2009 || Socorro || LINEAR || — || align=right | 3.3 km || 
|-id=438 bgcolor=#d6d6d6
| 249438 ||  || — || March 30, 2009 || Cordell-Lorenz || D. T. Durig || — || align=right | 6.7 km || 
|-id=439 bgcolor=#fefefe
| 249439 ||  || — || March 29, 2009 || Kitt Peak || Spacewatch || — || align=right | 1.2 km || 
|-id=440 bgcolor=#fefefe
| 249440 ||  || — || March 29, 2009 || Kitt Peak || Spacewatch || — || align=right | 2.2 km || 
|-id=441 bgcolor=#d6d6d6
| 249441 ||  || — || March 26, 2009 || Kitt Peak || Spacewatch || — || align=right | 2.7 km || 
|-id=442 bgcolor=#d6d6d6
| 249442 ||  || — || March 19, 2009 || Kitt Peak || Spacewatch || HYG || align=right | 3.6 km || 
|-id=443 bgcolor=#d6d6d6
| 249443 ||  || — || March 19, 2009 || Kitt Peak || Spacewatch || THM || align=right | 2.6 km || 
|-id=444 bgcolor=#d6d6d6
| 249444 ||  || — || March 16, 2009 || Kitt Peak || Spacewatch || — || align=right | 3.5 km || 
|-id=445 bgcolor=#d6d6d6
| 249445 ||  || — || March 28, 2009 || Kitt Peak || Spacewatch || — || align=right | 3.8 km || 
|-id=446 bgcolor=#d6d6d6
| 249446 ||  || — || March 19, 2009 || Mount Lemmon || Mount Lemmon Survey || ALA || align=right | 8.0 km || 
|-id=447 bgcolor=#d6d6d6
| 249447 ||  || — || March 17, 2009 || Kitt Peak || Spacewatch || EOS || align=right | 3.7 km || 
|-id=448 bgcolor=#d6d6d6
| 249448 ||  || — || March 18, 2009 || Kitt Peak || Spacewatch || — || align=right | 4.6 km || 
|-id=449 bgcolor=#d6d6d6
| 249449 ||  || — || April 13, 2009 || Kanab || E. E. Sheridan || HYG || align=right | 5.1 km || 
|-id=450 bgcolor=#fefefe
| 249450 ||  || — || April 17, 2009 || Kitt Peak || Spacewatch || NYS || align=right | 2.2 km || 
|-id=451 bgcolor=#E9E9E9
| 249451 ||  || — || April 17, 2009 || Kitt Peak || Spacewatch || — || align=right | 2.4 km || 
|-id=452 bgcolor=#E9E9E9
| 249452 ||  || — || April 20, 2009 || Tzec Maun || F. Tozzi || JUN || align=right | 1.9 km || 
|-id=453 bgcolor=#d6d6d6
| 249453 ||  || — || April 18, 2009 || Kitt Peak || Spacewatch || — || align=right | 3.9 km || 
|-id=454 bgcolor=#d6d6d6
| 249454 ||  || — || April 20, 2009 || Kitt Peak || Spacewatch || URS || align=right | 5.1 km || 
|-id=455 bgcolor=#d6d6d6
| 249455 ||  || — || April 20, 2009 || Kitt Peak || Spacewatch || — || align=right | 4.0 km || 
|-id=456 bgcolor=#d6d6d6
| 249456 ||  || — || April 17, 2009 || Catalina || CSS || — || align=right | 2.5 km || 
|-id=457 bgcolor=#fefefe
| 249457 ||  || — || April 20, 2009 || Socorro || LINEAR || — || align=right | 1.9 km || 
|-id=458 bgcolor=#d6d6d6
| 249458 ||  || — || April 23, 2009 || Kitt Peak || Spacewatch || — || align=right | 4.8 km || 
|-id=459 bgcolor=#d6d6d6
| 249459 ||  || — || April 24, 2009 || Cerro Burek || Alianza S4 Obs. || HYG || align=right | 3.0 km || 
|-id=460 bgcolor=#fefefe
| 249460 ||  || — || April 28, 2009 || Mount Lemmon || Mount Lemmon Survey || NYS || align=right | 1.2 km || 
|-id=461 bgcolor=#d6d6d6
| 249461 ||  || — || April 27, 2009 || Catalina || CSS || — || align=right | 3.8 km || 
|-id=462 bgcolor=#d6d6d6
| 249462 ||  || — || April 30, 2009 || Kitt Peak || Spacewatch || — || align=right | 3.9 km || 
|-id=463 bgcolor=#d6d6d6
| 249463 ||  || — || April 30, 2009 || Kitt Peak || Spacewatch || — || align=right | 4.7 km || 
|-id=464 bgcolor=#d6d6d6
| 249464 ||  || — || April 17, 2009 || Kitt Peak || Spacewatch || — || align=right | 3.9 km || 
|-id=465 bgcolor=#C2FFFF
| 249465 ||  || — || April 29, 2009 || Purple Mountain || PMO NEO || L5 || align=right | 11 km || 
|-id=466 bgcolor=#d6d6d6
| 249466 ||  || — || April 20, 2009 || Kitt Peak || Spacewatch || — || align=right | 3.1 km || 
|-id=467 bgcolor=#d6d6d6
| 249467 ||  || — || April 29, 2009 || Kitt Peak || Spacewatch || HYG || align=right | 3.9 km || 
|-id=468 bgcolor=#d6d6d6
| 249468 ||  || — || May 13, 2009 || Mount Lemmon || Mount Lemmon Survey || — || align=right | 4.8 km || 
|-id=469 bgcolor=#d6d6d6
| 249469 ||  || — || May 14, 2009 || Kitt Peak || Spacewatch || — || align=right | 4.3 km || 
|-id=470 bgcolor=#d6d6d6
| 249470 ||  || — || May 2, 2009 || La Sagra || OAM Obs. || — || align=right | 4.8 km || 
|-id=471 bgcolor=#E9E9E9
| 249471 ||  || — || May 24, 2009 || Catalina || CSS || JNS || align=right | 4.3 km || 
|-id=472 bgcolor=#d6d6d6
| 249472 ||  || — || May 25, 2009 || Kitt Peak || Spacewatch || — || align=right | 2.6 km || 
|-id=473 bgcolor=#d6d6d6
| 249473 ||  || — || May 25, 2009 || Kitt Peak || Spacewatch || — || align=right | 5.1 km || 
|-id=474 bgcolor=#d6d6d6
| 249474 ||  || — || May 29, 2009 || Mount Lemmon || Mount Lemmon Survey || — || align=right | 3.0 km || 
|-id=475 bgcolor=#d6d6d6
| 249475 ||  || — || May 27, 2009 || Kitt Peak || Spacewatch || EOS || align=right | 3.3 km || 
|-id=476 bgcolor=#C2FFFF
| 249476 ||  || — || June 15, 2009 || Kitt Peak || Spacewatch || L5 || align=right | 15 km || 
|-id=477 bgcolor=#d6d6d6
| 249477 ||  || — || July 18, 2009 || Sandlot || G. Hug || — || align=right | 3.2 km || 
|-id=478 bgcolor=#d6d6d6
| 249478 ||  || — || July 17, 2009 || La Sagra || OAM Obs. || ALA || align=right | 6.5 km || 
|-id=479 bgcolor=#d6d6d6
| 249479 ||  || — || October 13, 2009 || La Sagra || OAM Obs. || — || align=right | 4.3 km || 
|-id=480 bgcolor=#d6d6d6
| 249480 ||  || — || October 15, 2009 || Catalina || CSS || AEG || align=right | 6.5 km || 
|-id=481 bgcolor=#C2FFFF
| 249481 ||  || — || October 14, 2009 || La Sagra || OAM Obs. || L4ERY || align=right | 14 km || 
|-id=482 bgcolor=#d6d6d6
| 249482 ||  || — || October 15, 2009 || La Sagra || OAM Obs. || EOS || align=right | 3.7 km || 
|-id=483 bgcolor=#d6d6d6
| 249483 ||  || — || October 21, 2009 || Catalina || CSS || — || align=right | 4.7 km || 
|-id=484 bgcolor=#d6d6d6
| 249484 ||  || — || October 18, 2009 || Mount Lemmon || Mount Lemmon Survey || — || align=right | 3.2 km || 
|-id=485 bgcolor=#E9E9E9
| 249485 ||  || — || October 22, 2009 || Mount Lemmon || Mount Lemmon Survey || MIT || align=right | 3.8 km || 
|-id=486 bgcolor=#C2FFFF
| 249486 ||  || — || October 21, 2009 || Catalina || CSS || L4 || align=right | 12 km || 
|-id=487 bgcolor=#E9E9E9
| 249487 ||  || — || October 24, 2009 || Kitt Peak || Spacewatch || ADE || align=right | 3.6 km || 
|-id=488 bgcolor=#E9E9E9
| 249488 ||  || — || October 26, 2009 || Mount Lemmon || Mount Lemmon Survey || ADE || align=right | 4.2 km || 
|-id=489 bgcolor=#d6d6d6
| 249489 ||  || — || October 19, 2009 || La Sagra || OAM Obs. || — || align=right | 3.1 km || 
|-id=490 bgcolor=#E9E9E9
| 249490 ||  || — || October 25, 2009 || Catalina || CSS || — || align=right | 3.7 km || 
|-id=491 bgcolor=#d6d6d6
| 249491 ||  || — || October 23, 2009 || La Sagra || OAM Obs. || — || align=right | 2.8 km || 
|-id=492 bgcolor=#d6d6d6
| 249492 ||  || — || November 8, 2009 || Kitt Peak || Spacewatch || VER || align=right | 4.2 km || 
|-id=493 bgcolor=#E9E9E9
| 249493 ||  || — || November 9, 2009 || Kitt Peak || Spacewatch || — || align=right | 2.4 km || 
|-id=494 bgcolor=#d6d6d6
| 249494 ||  || — || November 15, 2009 || Mount Lemmon || Mount Lemmon Survey || Tj (2.96) || align=right | 6.7 km || 
|-id=495 bgcolor=#d6d6d6
| 249495 ||  || — || November 15, 2009 || Mount Lemmon || Mount Lemmon Survey || — || align=right | 3.8 km || 
|-id=496 bgcolor=#E9E9E9
| 249496 ||  || — || November 26, 2009 || Kitt Peak || Spacewatch || — || align=right | 2.3 km || 
|-id=497 bgcolor=#E9E9E9
| 249497 ||  || — || December 15, 2009 || Mount Lemmon || Mount Lemmon Survey || — || align=right | 2.9 km || 
|-id=498 bgcolor=#E9E9E9
| 249498 ||  || — || December 15, 2009 || Mount Lemmon || Mount Lemmon Survey || — || align=right | 2.8 km || 
|-id=499 bgcolor=#d6d6d6
| 249499 ||  || — || December 15, 2009 || Mount Lemmon || Mount Lemmon Survey || — || align=right | 5.8 km || 
|-id=500 bgcolor=#d6d6d6
| 249500 ||  || — || December 15, 2009 || Mount Lemmon || Mount Lemmon Survey || — || align=right | 5.0 km || 
|}

249501–249600 

|-bgcolor=#fefefe
| 249501 ||  || — || December 17, 2009 || Kitt Peak || Spacewatch || NYS || align=right data-sort-value="0.63" | 630 m || 
|-id=502 bgcolor=#E9E9E9
| 249502 ||  || — || December 19, 2009 || Mount Lemmon || Mount Lemmon Survey || EUN || align=right | 2.1 km || 
|-id=503 bgcolor=#d6d6d6
| 249503 ||  || — || December 27, 2009 || Kitt Peak || Spacewatch || — || align=right | 4.3 km || 
|-id=504 bgcolor=#d6d6d6
| 249504 ||  || — || December 20, 2009 || Kitt Peak || Spacewatch || HYG || align=right | 4.1 km || 
|-id=505 bgcolor=#E9E9E9
| 249505 ||  || — || January 6, 2010 || Kitt Peak || Spacewatch || DOR || align=right | 3.7 km || 
|-id=506 bgcolor=#E9E9E9
| 249506 ||  || — || January 7, 2010 || Kitt Peak || Spacewatch || XIZ || align=right | 2.1 km || 
|-id=507 bgcolor=#E9E9E9
| 249507 ||  || — || January 8, 2010 || Kitt Peak || Spacewatch || — || align=right | 2.4 km || 
|-id=508 bgcolor=#d6d6d6
| 249508 ||  || — || January 8, 2010 || Kitt Peak || Spacewatch || ITH || align=right | 2.3 km || 
|-id=509 bgcolor=#d6d6d6
| 249509 ||  || — || January 12, 2010 || Socorro || LINEAR || — || align=right | 3.3 km || 
|-id=510 bgcolor=#fefefe
| 249510 ||  || — || January 11, 2010 || Kitt Peak || Spacewatch || NYS || align=right | 2.3 km || 
|-id=511 bgcolor=#d6d6d6
| 249511 ||  || — || January 12, 2010 || Socorro || LINEAR || — || align=right | 6.4 km || 
|-id=512 bgcolor=#d6d6d6
| 249512 ||  || — || January 6, 2010 || Catalina || CSS || — || align=right | 6.1 km || 
|-id=513 bgcolor=#d6d6d6
| 249513 ||  || — || February 13, 2010 || Kitt Peak || Spacewatch || — || align=right | 5.4 km || 
|-id=514 bgcolor=#E9E9E9
| 249514 Donaldroyer ||  ||  || February 11, 2010 || WISE || WISE || — || align=right | 3.1 km || 
|-id=515 bgcolor=#E9E9E9
| 249515 Heinrichsen ||  ||  || February 12, 2010 || WISE || WISE || ADE || align=right | 3.1 km || 
|-id=516 bgcolor=#d6d6d6
| 249516 Aretha ||  ||  || February 15, 2010 || WISE || WISE || VER || align=right | 4.3 km || 
|-id=517 bgcolor=#d6d6d6
| 249517 ||  || — || February 9, 2010 || Catalina || CSS || EOS || align=right | 3.2 km || 
|-id=518 bgcolor=#d6d6d6
| 249518 ||  || — || February 13, 2010 || Mount Lemmon || Mount Lemmon Survey || — || align=right | 5.0 km || 
|-id=519 bgcolor=#E9E9E9
| 249519 Whitneyclavin ||  ||  || February 11, 2010 || WISE || WISE || — || align=right | 3.1 km || 
|-id=520 bgcolor=#d6d6d6
| 249520 Luppino ||  ||  || February 14, 2010 || Haleakala || Pan-STARRS || 7:4 || align=right | 4.2 km || 
|-id=521 bgcolor=#E9E9E9
| 249521 Truth ||  ||  || February 6, 2010 || WISE || WISE || — || align=right | 4.7 km || 
|-id=522 bgcolor=#E9E9E9
| 249522 Johndailey ||  ||  || February 16, 2010 || WISE || WISE || ADE || align=right | 3.9 km || 
|-id=523 bgcolor=#d6d6d6
| 249523 Friedan ||  ||  || February 22, 2010 || WISE || WISE || EUP || align=right | 5.4 km || 
|-id=524 bgcolor=#d6d6d6
| 249524 ||  || — || March 5, 2010 || Kitt Peak || Spacewatch || — || align=right | 3.3 km || 
|-id=525 bgcolor=#fefefe
| 249525 ||  || — || March 25, 2010 || Kitt Peak || Spacewatch || ERI || align=right | 2.1 km || 
|-id=526 bgcolor=#E9E9E9
| 249526 ||  || — || March 19, 2010 || Mount Lemmon || Mount Lemmon Survey || HOF || align=right | 2.9 km || 
|-id=527 bgcolor=#E9E9E9
| 249527 ||  || — || March 25, 2010 || Kitt Peak || Spacewatch || — || align=right | 2.6 km || 
|-id=528 bgcolor=#fefefe
| 249528 ||  || — || April 8, 2010 || Purple Mountain || PMO NEO || — || align=right | 2.8 km || 
|-id=529 bgcolor=#fefefe
| 249529 ||  || — || April 4, 2010 || Kitt Peak || Spacewatch || FLO || align=right | 2.1 km || 
|-id=530 bgcolor=#fefefe
| 249530 Ericrice ||  ||  || April 14, 2010 || WISE || WISE || ERI || align=right | 1.9 km || 
|-id=531 bgcolor=#d6d6d6
| 249531 ||  || — || April 10, 2010 || Mount Lemmon || Mount Lemmon Survey || — || align=right | 4.4 km || 
|-id=532 bgcolor=#d6d6d6
| 249532 ||  || — || April 11, 2010 || Kitt Peak || Spacewatch || — || align=right | 2.4 km || 
|-id=533 bgcolor=#E9E9E9
| 249533 ||  || — || April 9, 2010 || Kitt Peak || Spacewatch || NEM || align=right | 2.7 km || 
|-id=534 bgcolor=#d6d6d6
| 249534 ||  || — || April 10, 2010 || Kitt Peak || Spacewatch || EOS || align=right | 5.4 km || 
|-id=535 bgcolor=#d6d6d6
| 249535 ||  || — || April 4, 2010 || Kitt Peak || Spacewatch || — || align=right | 3.9 km || 
|-id=536 bgcolor=#d6d6d6
| 249536 ||  || — || April 9, 2010 || Catalina || CSS || — || align=right | 5.1 km || 
|-id=537 bgcolor=#E9E9E9
| 249537 ||  || — || April 10, 2010 || Kitt Peak || Spacewatch || — || align=right | 2.8 km || 
|-id=538 bgcolor=#d6d6d6
| 249538 ||  || — || April 15, 2010 || Kitt Peak || Spacewatch || — || align=right | 5.7 km || 
|-id=539 bgcolor=#d6d6d6
| 249539 Pedrosevilla ||  ||  || April 16, 2010 || WISE || WISE || — || align=right | 3.0 km || 
|-id=540 bgcolor=#d6d6d6
| 249540 Eugeniescott ||  ||  || April 18, 2010 || WISE || WISE || — || align=right | 5.2 km || 
|-id=541 bgcolor=#d6d6d6
| 249541 Steinem ||  ||  || April 19, 2010 || WISE || WISE || — || align=right | 5.3 km || 
|-id=542 bgcolor=#E9E9E9
| 249542 ||  || — || April 21, 2010 || WISE || WISE || MIT || align=right | 2.9 km || 
|-id=543 bgcolor=#d6d6d6
| 249543 ||  || — || April 21, 2010 || WISE || WISE || — || align=right | 6.4 km || 
|-id=544 bgcolor=#d6d6d6
| 249544 Ianmclean ||  ||  || April 23, 2010 || WISE || WISE || — || align=right | 4.8 km || 
|-id=545 bgcolor=#C2FFFF
| 249545 ||  || — || April 23, 2010 || WISE || WISE || L5 || align=right | 12 km || 
|-id=546 bgcolor=#E9E9E9
| 249546 ||  || — || April 23, 2010 || WISE || WISE || JUN || align=right | 1.5 km || 
|-id=547 bgcolor=#fefefe
| 249547 ||  || — || April 28, 2010 || WISE || WISE || NYS || align=right | 1.6 km || 
|-id=548 bgcolor=#E9E9E9
| 249548 ||  || — || April 25, 2010 || Kitt Peak || Spacewatch || — || align=right | 2.4 km || 
|-id=549 bgcolor=#E9E9E9
| 249549 ||  || — || May 4, 2010 || Catalina || CSS || — || align=right | 2.7 km || 
|-id=550 bgcolor=#E9E9E9
| 249550 ||  || — || May 5, 2010 || Mount Lemmon || Mount Lemmon Survey || DOR || align=right | 3.6 km || 
|-id=551 bgcolor=#d6d6d6
| 249551 ||  || — || May 5, 2010 || Mount Lemmon || Mount Lemmon Survey || — || align=right | 5.1 km || 
|-id=552 bgcolor=#E9E9E9
| 249552 ||  || — || May 5, 2010 || Catalina || CSS || — || align=right | 3.0 km || 
|-id=553 bgcolor=#d6d6d6
| 249553 ||  || — || May 14, 2010 || WISE || WISE || IMH || align=right | 4.8 km || 
|-id=554 bgcolor=#d6d6d6
| 249554 ||  || — || May 10, 2010 || Mount Lemmon || Mount Lemmon Survey || — || align=right | 4.1 km || 
|-id=555 bgcolor=#d6d6d6
| 249555 ||  || — || May 12, 2010 || Kitt Peak || Spacewatch || — || align=right | 3.9 km || 
|-id=556 bgcolor=#d6d6d6
| 249556 ||  || — || May 18, 2010 || WISE || WISE || — || align=right | 5.8 km || 
|-id=557 bgcolor=#E9E9E9
| 249557 ||  || — || May 17, 2010 || Kitt Peak || Spacewatch || — || align=right | 2.9 km || 
|-id=558 bgcolor=#fefefe
| 249558 || 2858 P-L || — || September 24, 1960 || Palomar || PLS || — || align=right data-sort-value="0.76" | 760 m || 
|-id=559 bgcolor=#E9E9E9
| 249559 || 3079 P-L || — || September 25, 1960 || Palomar || PLS || — || align=right | 1.2 km || 
|-id=560 bgcolor=#fefefe
| 249560 || 4176 P-L || — || September 24, 1960 || Palomar || PLS || — || align=right | 1.4 km || 
|-id=561 bgcolor=#E9E9E9
| 249561 || 4547 P-L || — || September 24, 1960 || Palomar || PLS || EUN || align=right | 1.7 km || 
|-id=562 bgcolor=#E9E9E9
| 249562 || 5019 T-2 || — || September 25, 1973 || Palomar || PLS || — || align=right | 1.5 km || 
|-id=563 bgcolor=#fefefe
| 249563 || 2233 T-3 || — || October 16, 1977 || Palomar || PLS || — || align=right data-sort-value="0.94" | 940 m || 
|-id=564 bgcolor=#fefefe
| 249564 || 2238 T-3 || — || October 16, 1977 || Palomar || PLS || — || align=right | 2.8 km || 
|-id=565 bgcolor=#E9E9E9
| 249565 || 2298 T-3 || — || October 16, 1977 || Palomar || PLS || — || align=right | 1.2 km || 
|-id=566 bgcolor=#fefefe
| 249566 || 3386 T-3 || — || October 16, 1977 || Palomar || PLS || — || align=right | 2.0 km || 
|-id=567 bgcolor=#E9E9E9
| 249567 || 5102 T-3 || — || October 16, 1977 || Palomar || PLS || — || align=right | 2.9 km || 
|-id=568 bgcolor=#E9E9E9
| 249568 || 1985 RX || — || September 14, 1985 || Kitt Peak || Spacewatch || — || align=right | 1.4 km || 
|-id=569 bgcolor=#E9E9E9
| 249569 ||  || — || September 26, 1989 || La Silla || E. W. Elst || — || align=right | 2.5 km || 
|-id=570 bgcolor=#E9E9E9
| 249570 ||  || — || September 24, 1992 || Kitt Peak || Spacewatch || HEN || align=right | 1.6 km || 
|-id=571 bgcolor=#E9E9E9
| 249571 ||  || — || October 9, 1993 || La Silla || E. W. Elst || — || align=right | 2.0 km || 
|-id=572 bgcolor=#d6d6d6
| 249572 ||  || — || September 3, 1994 || La Silla || E. W. Elst || — || align=right | 5.4 km || 
|-id=573 bgcolor=#d6d6d6
| 249573 ||  || — || September 12, 1994 || Xinglong || SCAP || — || align=right | 5.0 km || 
|-id=574 bgcolor=#d6d6d6
| 249574 ||  || — || October 28, 1994 || Kitt Peak || Spacewatch || — || align=right | 3.3 km || 
|-id=575 bgcolor=#E9E9E9
| 249575 ||  || — || January 29, 1995 || Kitt Peak || Spacewatch || — || align=right | 1.4 km || 
|-id=576 bgcolor=#E9E9E9
| 249576 ||  || — || March 23, 1995 || Kitt Peak || Spacewatch || — || align=right | 3.5 km || 
|-id=577 bgcolor=#d6d6d6
| 249577 ||  || — || September 18, 1995 || Kitt Peak || Spacewatch || — || align=right | 3.9 km || 
|-id=578 bgcolor=#fefefe
| 249578 ||  || — || September 19, 1995 || Kitt Peak || Spacewatch || — || align=right | 1.5 km || 
|-id=579 bgcolor=#fefefe
| 249579 ||  || — || September 19, 1995 || Kitt Peak || Spacewatch || — || align=right | 1.3 km || 
|-id=580 bgcolor=#d6d6d6
| 249580 ||  || — || September 22, 1995 || Kitt Peak || Spacewatch || — || align=right | 3.1 km || 
|-id=581 bgcolor=#fefefe
| 249581 ||  || — || September 26, 1995 || Kitt Peak || Spacewatch || EUT || align=right data-sort-value="0.74" | 740 m || 
|-id=582 bgcolor=#d6d6d6
| 249582 ||  || — || September 26, 1995 || Kitt Peak || Spacewatch || — || align=right | 3.5 km || 
|-id=583 bgcolor=#d6d6d6
| 249583 ||  || — || October 15, 1995 || Kitt Peak || Spacewatch || — || align=right | 3.1 km || 
|-id=584 bgcolor=#fefefe
| 249584 ||  || — || October 17, 1995 || Kitt Peak || Spacewatch || — || align=right | 1.2 km || 
|-id=585 bgcolor=#fefefe
| 249585 ||  || — || October 17, 1995 || Kitt Peak || Spacewatch || — || align=right | 1.0 km || 
|-id=586 bgcolor=#d6d6d6
| 249586 ||  || — || November 16, 1995 || Kitt Peak || Spacewatch || — || align=right | 2.5 km || 
|-id=587 bgcolor=#fefefe
| 249587 ||  || — || November 18, 1995 || Kitt Peak || Spacewatch || V || align=right data-sort-value="0.85" | 850 m || 
|-id=588 bgcolor=#fefefe
| 249588 ||  || — || September 13, 1996 || Kitt Peak || Spacewatch || — || align=right | 1.1 km || 
|-id=589 bgcolor=#fefefe
| 249589 ||  || — || October 4, 1996 || Kitt Peak || Spacewatch || — || align=right | 1.1 km || 
|-id=590 bgcolor=#E9E9E9
| 249590 ||  || — || October 17, 1996 || Kitt Peak || Spacewatch || — || align=right | 3.7 km || 
|-id=591 bgcolor=#d6d6d6
| 249591 ||  || — || January 31, 1997 || Kitt Peak || Spacewatch || — || align=right | 4.9 km || 
|-id=592 bgcolor=#d6d6d6
| 249592 || 1997 CL || — || February 1, 1997 || Kitt Peak || Spacewatch || EOS || align=right | 2.4 km || 
|-id=593 bgcolor=#d6d6d6
| 249593 ||  || — || February 1, 1997 || Kitt Peak || Spacewatch || — || align=right | 2.7 km || 
|-id=594 bgcolor=#fefefe
| 249594 ||  || — || February 4, 1997 || Kitt Peak || Spacewatch || — || align=right | 1.0 km || 
|-id=595 bgcolor=#FFC2E0
| 249595 ||  || — || April 13, 1997 || Kitt Peak || Spacewatch || AMO +1km || align=right | 1.0 km || 
|-id=596 bgcolor=#E9E9E9
| 249596 ||  || — || September 8, 1997 || Caussols || ODAS || JUN || align=right | 1.3 km || 
|-id=597 bgcolor=#E9E9E9
| 249597 ||  || — || September 30, 1997 || Kitt Peak || Spacewatch || — || align=right | 3.4 km || 
|-id=598 bgcolor=#E9E9E9
| 249598 ||  || — || November 24, 1997 || Kitt Peak || Spacewatch || CLO || align=right | 3.1 km || 
|-id=599 bgcolor=#E9E9E9
| 249599 ||  || — || December 21, 1997 || Xinglong || SCAP || — || align=right | 2.7 km || 
|-id=600 bgcolor=#E9E9E9
| 249600 ||  || — || January 2, 1998 || Kitt Peak || Spacewatch || HOF || align=right | 4.5 km || 
|}

249601–249700 

|-bgcolor=#E9E9E9
| 249601 ||  || — || September 14, 1998 || Socorro || LINEAR || — || align=right | 1.1 km || 
|-id=602 bgcolor=#d6d6d6
| 249602 ||  || — || September 25, 1998 || Kitt Peak || Spacewatch || THM || align=right | 3.2 km || 
|-id=603 bgcolor=#E9E9E9
| 249603 ||  || — || March 19, 1999 || Socorro || LINEAR || — || align=right | 4.1 km || 
|-id=604 bgcolor=#E9E9E9
| 249604 ||  || — || April 17, 1999 || Socorro || LINEAR || — || align=right | 4.1 km || 
|-id=605 bgcolor=#d6d6d6
| 249605 ||  || — || September 7, 1999 || Socorro || LINEAR || EMA || align=right | 5.2 km || 
|-id=606 bgcolor=#fefefe
| 249606 ||  || — || September 7, 1999 || Socorro || LINEAR || — || align=right | 1.4 km || 
|-id=607 bgcolor=#d6d6d6
| 249607 ||  || — || September 9, 1999 || Socorro || LINEAR || — || align=right | 2.3 km || 
|-id=608 bgcolor=#d6d6d6
| 249608 ||  || — || September 9, 1999 || Socorro || LINEAR || — || align=right | 4.0 km || 
|-id=609 bgcolor=#fefefe
| 249609 ||  || — || September 9, 1999 || Socorro || LINEAR || — || align=right | 1.2 km || 
|-id=610 bgcolor=#fefefe
| 249610 ||  || — || September 9, 1999 || Socorro || LINEAR || — || align=right | 1.1 km || 
|-id=611 bgcolor=#fefefe
| 249611 ||  || — || September 9, 1999 || Socorro || LINEAR || MAS || align=right data-sort-value="0.93" | 930 m || 
|-id=612 bgcolor=#d6d6d6
| 249612 ||  || — || September 8, 1999 || Socorro || LINEAR || — || align=right | 3.1 km || 
|-id=613 bgcolor=#d6d6d6
| 249613 ||  || — || September 8, 1999 || Socorro || LINEAR || — || align=right | 3.0 km || 
|-id=614 bgcolor=#d6d6d6
| 249614 ||  || — || October 4, 1999 || Socorro || LINEAR || Tj (2.97) || align=right | 4.7 km || 
|-id=615 bgcolor=#FFC2E0
| 249615 ||  || — || October 2, 1999 || Catalina || CSS || AMO || align=right data-sort-value="0.58" | 580 m || 
|-id=616 bgcolor=#fefefe
| 249616 ||  || — || October 11, 1999 || Črni Vrh || Črni Vrh || — || align=right | 1.4 km || 
|-id=617 bgcolor=#d6d6d6
| 249617 ||  || — || October 2, 1999 || Kitt Peak || Spacewatch || — || align=right | 6.9 km || 
|-id=618 bgcolor=#d6d6d6
| 249618 ||  || — || October 4, 1999 || Socorro || LINEAR || EOS || align=right | 3.4 km || 
|-id=619 bgcolor=#d6d6d6
| 249619 ||  || — || October 3, 1999 || Socorro || LINEAR || — || align=right | 4.0 km || 
|-id=620 bgcolor=#d6d6d6
| 249620 ||  || — || October 5, 1999 || Socorro || LINEAR || EUP || align=right | 6.1 km || 
|-id=621 bgcolor=#fefefe
| 249621 ||  || — || October 1, 1999 || Catalina || CSS || — || align=right | 1.4 km || 
|-id=622 bgcolor=#fefefe
| 249622 ||  || — || October 3, 1999 || Kitt Peak || Spacewatch || — || align=right data-sort-value="0.81" | 810 m || 
|-id=623 bgcolor=#d6d6d6
| 249623 ||  || — || October 4, 1999 || Kitt Peak || Spacewatch || URS || align=right | 3.9 km || 
|-id=624 bgcolor=#d6d6d6
| 249624 ||  || — || October 4, 1999 || Kitt Peak || Spacewatch || — || align=right | 2.9 km || 
|-id=625 bgcolor=#fefefe
| 249625 ||  || — || October 4, 1999 || Kitt Peak || Spacewatch || — || align=right | 1.8 km || 
|-id=626 bgcolor=#fefefe
| 249626 ||  || — || October 4, 1999 || Kitt Peak || Spacewatch || — || align=right | 1.00 km || 
|-id=627 bgcolor=#d6d6d6
| 249627 ||  || — || October 7, 1999 || Kitt Peak || Spacewatch || EOS || align=right | 3.5 km || 
|-id=628 bgcolor=#d6d6d6
| 249628 ||  || — || October 7, 1999 || Kitt Peak || Spacewatch || — || align=right | 2.8 km || 
|-id=629 bgcolor=#d6d6d6
| 249629 ||  || — || October 9, 1999 || Kitt Peak || Spacewatch || — || align=right | 3.9 km || 
|-id=630 bgcolor=#d6d6d6
| 249630 ||  || — || October 9, 1999 || Kitt Peak || Spacewatch || — || align=right | 3.5 km || 
|-id=631 bgcolor=#fefefe
| 249631 ||  || — || October 4, 1999 || Socorro || LINEAR || V || align=right | 1.2 km || 
|-id=632 bgcolor=#d6d6d6
| 249632 ||  || — || October 4, 1999 || Socorro || LINEAR || — || align=right | 7.6 km || 
|-id=633 bgcolor=#d6d6d6
| 249633 ||  || — || October 4, 1999 || Socorro || LINEAR || — || align=right | 4.2 km || 
|-id=634 bgcolor=#d6d6d6
| 249634 ||  || — || October 4, 1999 || Socorro || LINEAR || — || align=right | 2.6 km || 
|-id=635 bgcolor=#fefefe
| 249635 ||  || — || October 4, 1999 || Socorro || LINEAR || — || align=right | 1.1 km || 
|-id=636 bgcolor=#d6d6d6
| 249636 ||  || — || October 6, 1999 || Socorro || LINEAR || — || align=right | 4.3 km || 
|-id=637 bgcolor=#d6d6d6
| 249637 ||  || — || October 6, 1999 || Socorro || LINEAR || — || align=right | 5.4 km || 
|-id=638 bgcolor=#d6d6d6
| 249638 ||  || — || October 7, 1999 || Socorro || LINEAR || — || align=right | 3.0 km || 
|-id=639 bgcolor=#d6d6d6
| 249639 ||  || — || October 9, 1999 || Socorro || LINEAR || — || align=right | 5.0 km || 
|-id=640 bgcolor=#d6d6d6
| 249640 ||  || — || October 10, 1999 || Socorro || LINEAR || HYG || align=right | 4.5 km || 
|-id=641 bgcolor=#d6d6d6
| 249641 ||  || — || October 11, 1999 || Socorro || LINEAR || — || align=right | 4.1 km || 
|-id=642 bgcolor=#d6d6d6
| 249642 ||  || — || October 12, 1999 || Socorro || LINEAR || LIX || align=right | 5.3 km || 
|-id=643 bgcolor=#fefefe
| 249643 ||  || — || October 12, 1999 || Socorro || LINEAR || — || align=right | 1.5 km || 
|-id=644 bgcolor=#d6d6d6
| 249644 ||  || — || October 13, 1999 || Socorro || LINEAR || — || align=right | 3.4 km || 
|-id=645 bgcolor=#fefefe
| 249645 ||  || — || October 15, 1999 || Socorro || LINEAR || — || align=right | 1.2 km || 
|-id=646 bgcolor=#d6d6d6
| 249646 ||  || — || October 4, 1999 || Kitt Peak || Spacewatch || — || align=right | 4.0 km || 
|-id=647 bgcolor=#fefefe
| 249647 ||  || — || October 4, 1999 || Catalina || CSS || V || align=right | 1.2 km || 
|-id=648 bgcolor=#fefefe
| 249648 ||  || — || October 9, 1999 || Socorro || LINEAR || MAS || align=right data-sort-value="0.99" | 990 m || 
|-id=649 bgcolor=#fefefe
| 249649 ||  || — || October 9, 1999 || Socorro || LINEAR || ERI || align=right | 3.0 km || 
|-id=650 bgcolor=#d6d6d6
| 249650 ||  || — || October 9, 1999 || Socorro || LINEAR || THM || align=right | 3.3 km || 
|-id=651 bgcolor=#d6d6d6
| 249651 ||  || — || October 3, 1999 || Socorro || LINEAR || TIR || align=right | 5.0 km || 
|-id=652 bgcolor=#d6d6d6
| 249652 ||  || — || October 3, 1999 || Socorro || LINEAR || — || align=right | 4.6 km || 
|-id=653 bgcolor=#fefefe
| 249653 ||  || — || October 8, 1999 || Catalina || CSS || — || align=right | 1.2 km || 
|-id=654 bgcolor=#d6d6d6
| 249654 ||  || — || October 12, 1999 || Kitt Peak || Spacewatch || — || align=right | 3.1 km || 
|-id=655 bgcolor=#d6d6d6
| 249655 ||  || — || October 12, 1999 || Kitt Peak || Spacewatch || EOS || align=right | 3.3 km || 
|-id=656 bgcolor=#d6d6d6
| 249656 ||  || — || October 29, 1999 || Kitt Peak || Spacewatch || HYG || align=right | 4.0 km || 
|-id=657 bgcolor=#d6d6d6
| 249657 ||  || — || October 31, 1999 || Catalina || CSS || — || align=right | 2.2 km || 
|-id=658 bgcolor=#fefefe
| 249658 ||  || — || November 2, 1999 || Socorro || LINEAR || H || align=right | 1.2 km || 
|-id=659 bgcolor=#fefefe
| 249659 ||  || — || November 2, 1999 || Socorro || LINEAR || PHO || align=right | 2.6 km || 
|-id=660 bgcolor=#d6d6d6
| 249660 ||  || — || November 2, 1999 || Kitt Peak || Spacewatch || VER || align=right | 3.5 km || 
|-id=661 bgcolor=#fefefe
| 249661 ||  || — || November 2, 1999 || Kitt Peak || Spacewatch || NYS || align=right | 2.0 km || 
|-id=662 bgcolor=#fefefe
| 249662 ||  || — || November 3, 1999 || Catalina || CSS || — || align=right | 1.0 km || 
|-id=663 bgcolor=#fefefe
| 249663 ||  || — || November 4, 1999 || Kitt Peak || Spacewatch || MAS || align=right data-sort-value="0.93" | 930 m || 
|-id=664 bgcolor=#d6d6d6
| 249664 ||  || — || November 4, 1999 || Kitt Peak || Spacewatch || — || align=right | 3.8 km || 
|-id=665 bgcolor=#fefefe
| 249665 ||  || — || November 3, 1999 || Socorro || LINEAR || — || align=right | 1.6 km || 
|-id=666 bgcolor=#d6d6d6
| 249666 ||  || — || November 5, 1999 || Kitt Peak || Spacewatch || ELF || align=right | 4.6 km || 
|-id=667 bgcolor=#fefefe
| 249667 ||  || — || November 9, 1999 || Socorro || LINEAR || — || align=right | 1.1 km || 
|-id=668 bgcolor=#d6d6d6
| 249668 ||  || — || November 9, 1999 || Socorro || LINEAR || THM || align=right | 3.7 km || 
|-id=669 bgcolor=#fefefe
| 249669 ||  || — || November 9, 1999 || Socorro || LINEAR || NYS || align=right data-sort-value="0.86" | 860 m || 
|-id=670 bgcolor=#fefefe
| 249670 ||  || — || November 11, 1999 || Kitt Peak || Spacewatch || ERI || align=right | 2.2 km || 
|-id=671 bgcolor=#fefefe
| 249671 ||  || — || November 10, 1999 || Kitt Peak || Spacewatch || — || align=right | 1.1 km || 
|-id=672 bgcolor=#d6d6d6
| 249672 ||  || — || November 13, 1999 || Kitt Peak || Spacewatch || — || align=right | 2.9 km || 
|-id=673 bgcolor=#fefefe
| 249673 ||  || — || November 14, 1999 || Socorro || LINEAR || NYS || align=right data-sort-value="0.99" | 990 m || 
|-id=674 bgcolor=#fefefe
| 249674 ||  || — || November 14, 1999 || Socorro || LINEAR || NYS || align=right data-sort-value="0.93" | 930 m || 
|-id=675 bgcolor=#d6d6d6
| 249675 ||  || — || November 6, 1999 || Socorro || LINEAR || — || align=right | 3.9 km || 
|-id=676 bgcolor=#d6d6d6
| 249676 ||  || — || November 15, 1999 || Socorro || LINEAR || TIR || align=right | 2.8 km || 
|-id=677 bgcolor=#fefefe
| 249677 ||  || — || November 15, 1999 || Socorro || LINEAR || — || align=right | 1.3 km || 
|-id=678 bgcolor=#d6d6d6
| 249678 ||  || — || November 14, 1999 || Socorro || LINEAR || THM || align=right | 3.6 km || 
|-id=679 bgcolor=#d6d6d6
| 249679 ||  || — || November 3, 1999 || Socorro || LINEAR || — || align=right | 4.0 km || 
|-id=680 bgcolor=#d6d6d6
| 249680 ||  || — || November 3, 1999 || Socorro || LINEAR || — || align=right | 9.4 km || 
|-id=681 bgcolor=#d6d6d6
| 249681 ||  || — || December 5, 1999 || Catalina || CSS || MEL || align=right | 5.8 km || 
|-id=682 bgcolor=#fefefe
| 249682 ||  || — || December 12, 1999 || Socorro || LINEAR || H || align=right | 1.2 km || 
|-id=683 bgcolor=#d6d6d6
| 249683 ||  || — || December 8, 1999 || Socorro || LINEAR || LIX || align=right | 9.7 km || 
|-id=684 bgcolor=#fefefe
| 249684 ||  || — || December 7, 1999 || Catalina || CSS || CHL || align=right | 2.1 km || 
|-id=685 bgcolor=#FA8072
| 249685 ||  || — || December 19, 1999 || Socorro || LINEAR || PHO || align=right | 2.2 km || 
|-id=686 bgcolor=#E9E9E9
| 249686 ||  || — || January 2, 2000 || Kitt Peak || Spacewatch || — || align=right | 1.5 km || 
|-id=687 bgcolor=#FA8072
| 249687 ||  || — || January 5, 2000 || Socorro || LINEAR || — || align=right | 2.2 km || 
|-id=688 bgcolor=#E9E9E9
| 249688 || 2000 CL || — || February 2, 2000 || Prescott || P. G. Comba || — || align=right | 1.4 km || 
|-id=689 bgcolor=#E9E9E9
| 249689 ||  || — || February 3, 2000 || Kitt Peak || Spacewatch || — || align=right | 1.1 km || 
|-id=690 bgcolor=#E9E9E9
| 249690 ||  || — || February 28, 2000 || Kitt Peak || Spacewatch || — || align=right | 1.4 km || 
|-id=691 bgcolor=#E9E9E9
| 249691 ||  || — || February 29, 2000 || Socorro || LINEAR || — || align=right | 1.6 km || 
|-id=692 bgcolor=#d6d6d6
| 249692 ||  || — || February 29, 2000 || Socorro || LINEAR || — || align=right | 6.2 km || 
|-id=693 bgcolor=#E9E9E9
| 249693 ||  || — || February 29, 2000 || Socorro || LINEAR || JUN || align=right | 1.7 km || 
|-id=694 bgcolor=#E9E9E9
| 249694 ||  || — || February 29, 2000 || Socorro || LINEAR || MAR || align=right | 1.3 km || 
|-id=695 bgcolor=#E9E9E9
| 249695 ||  || — || February 29, 2000 || Socorro || LINEAR || — || align=right | 1.4 km || 
|-id=696 bgcolor=#E9E9E9
| 249696 ||  || — || February 29, 2000 || Socorro || LINEAR || RAF || align=right | 1.5 km || 
|-id=697 bgcolor=#E9E9E9
| 249697 ||  || — || March 4, 2000 || Kitt Peak || Spacewatch || — || align=right data-sort-value="0.92" | 920 m || 
|-id=698 bgcolor=#E9E9E9
| 249698 ||  || — || March 8, 2000 || Socorro || LINEAR || — || align=right | 2.1 km || 
|-id=699 bgcolor=#E9E9E9
| 249699 ||  || — || March 3, 2000 || Socorro || LINEAR || — || align=right | 1.4 km || 
|-id=700 bgcolor=#E9E9E9
| 249700 ||  || — || March 27, 2000 || Anderson Mesa || LONEOS || — || align=right | 1.7 km || 
|}

249701–249800 

|-bgcolor=#E9E9E9
| 249701 ||  || — || April 5, 2000 || Socorro || LINEAR || — || align=right | 1.5 km || 
|-id=702 bgcolor=#E9E9E9
| 249702 ||  || — || April 5, 2000 || Kitt Peak || Spacewatch || — || align=right | 2.1 km || 
|-id=703 bgcolor=#E9E9E9
| 249703 ||  || — || April 5, 2000 || Socorro || LINEAR || — || align=right | 2.2 km || 
|-id=704 bgcolor=#E9E9E9
| 249704 ||  || — || April 25, 2000 || Kitt Peak || Spacewatch || — || align=right | 2.5 km || 
|-id=705 bgcolor=#E9E9E9
| 249705 ||  || — || April 25, 2000 || Anderson Mesa || LONEOS || — || align=right | 2.4 km || 
|-id=706 bgcolor=#E9E9E9
| 249706 ||  || — || May 5, 2000 || Kitt Peak || Spacewatch || — || align=right | 2.1 km || 
|-id=707 bgcolor=#E9E9E9
| 249707 ||  || — || May 26, 2000 || Anderson Mesa || LONEOS || CLO || align=right | 2.3 km || 
|-id=708 bgcolor=#FA8072
| 249708 ||  || — || July 31, 2000 || Socorro || LINEAR || — || align=right | 1.3 km || 
|-id=709 bgcolor=#fefefe
| 249709 ||  || — || July 29, 2000 || Anderson Mesa || LONEOS || — || align=right | 1.2 km || 
|-id=710 bgcolor=#fefefe
| 249710 ||  || — || August 24, 2000 || Socorro || LINEAR || — || align=right | 1.2 km || 
|-id=711 bgcolor=#fefefe
| 249711 ||  || — || August 24, 2000 || Socorro || LINEAR || FLO || align=right | 1.2 km || 
|-id=712 bgcolor=#fefefe
| 249712 ||  || — || August 24, 2000 || Wise || Wise Obs. || — || align=right | 1.1 km || 
|-id=713 bgcolor=#d6d6d6
| 249713 ||  || — || August 24, 2000 || Socorro || LINEAR || — || align=right | 3.9 km || 
|-id=714 bgcolor=#fefefe
| 249714 ||  || — || August 31, 2000 || Socorro || LINEAR || — || align=right | 1.2 km || 
|-id=715 bgcolor=#fefefe
| 249715 ||  || — || August 31, 2000 || Socorro || LINEAR || FLO || align=right data-sort-value="0.77" | 770 m || 
|-id=716 bgcolor=#fefefe
| 249716 ||  || — || August 31, 2000 || Socorro || LINEAR || FLO || align=right data-sort-value="0.95" | 950 m || 
|-id=717 bgcolor=#d6d6d6
| 249717 ||  || — || August 31, 2000 || Socorro || LINEAR || — || align=right | 4.1 km || 
|-id=718 bgcolor=#fefefe
| 249718 ||  || — || August 28, 2000 || Socorro || LINEAR || FLO || align=right | 1.1 km || 
|-id=719 bgcolor=#fefefe
| 249719 ||  || — || September 1, 2000 || Socorro || LINEAR || — || align=right | 1.1 km || 
|-id=720 bgcolor=#fefefe
| 249720 ||  || — || September 1, 2000 || Socorro || LINEAR || FLO || align=right | 1.2 km || 
|-id=721 bgcolor=#d6d6d6
| 249721 ||  || — || September 2, 2000 || Anderson Mesa || LONEOS || — || align=right | 3.5 km || 
|-id=722 bgcolor=#d6d6d6
| 249722 ||  || — || September 4, 2000 || Anderson Mesa || LONEOS || 627 || align=right | 3.8 km || 
|-id=723 bgcolor=#d6d6d6
| 249723 ||  || — || September 22, 2000 || Haleakala || NEAT || — || align=right | 4.1 km || 
|-id=724 bgcolor=#fefefe
| 249724 ||  || — || September 23, 2000 || Socorro || LINEAR || — || align=right | 1.1 km || 
|-id=725 bgcolor=#FA8072
| 249725 ||  || — || September 23, 2000 || Socorro || LINEAR || — || align=right | 1.2 km || 
|-id=726 bgcolor=#fefefe
| 249726 ||  || — || September 23, 2000 || Socorro || LINEAR || FLO || align=right data-sort-value="0.87" | 870 m || 
|-id=727 bgcolor=#fefefe
| 249727 ||  || — || September 24, 2000 || Socorro || LINEAR || — || align=right | 1.3 km || 
|-id=728 bgcolor=#fefefe
| 249728 ||  || — || September 24, 2000 || Socorro || LINEAR || — || align=right data-sort-value="0.84" | 840 m || 
|-id=729 bgcolor=#fefefe
| 249729 ||  || — || September 24, 2000 || Socorro || LINEAR || — || align=right data-sort-value="0.98" | 980 m || 
|-id=730 bgcolor=#FA8072
| 249730 ||  || — || September 28, 2000 || Socorro || LINEAR || H || align=right data-sort-value="0.91" | 910 m || 
|-id=731 bgcolor=#fefefe
| 249731 ||  || — || September 24, 2000 || Socorro || LINEAR || FLO || align=right data-sort-value="0.91" | 910 m || 
|-id=732 bgcolor=#fefefe
| 249732 ||  || — || September 24, 2000 || Socorro || LINEAR || FLO || align=right | 1.3 km || 
|-id=733 bgcolor=#fefefe
| 249733 ||  || — || September 24, 2000 || Socorro || LINEAR || — || align=right | 1.2 km || 
|-id=734 bgcolor=#fefefe
| 249734 ||  || — || September 24, 2000 || Socorro || LINEAR || — || align=right data-sort-value="0.92" | 920 m || 
|-id=735 bgcolor=#d6d6d6
| 249735 ||  || — || September 23, 2000 || Socorro || LINEAR || — || align=right | 4.7 km || 
|-id=736 bgcolor=#fefefe
| 249736 ||  || — || September 24, 2000 || Socorro || LINEAR || — || align=right | 1.0 km || 
|-id=737 bgcolor=#fefefe
| 249737 ||  || — || September 23, 2000 || Socorro || LINEAR || — || align=right | 1.2 km || 
|-id=738 bgcolor=#d6d6d6
| 249738 ||  || — || September 27, 2000 || Kitt Peak || Spacewatch || — || align=right | 3.6 km || 
|-id=739 bgcolor=#d6d6d6
| 249739 ||  || — || September 28, 2000 || Socorro || LINEAR || — || align=right | 4.6 km || 
|-id=740 bgcolor=#fefefe
| 249740 ||  || — || September 24, 2000 || Socorro || LINEAR || FLO || align=right data-sort-value="0.87" | 870 m || 
|-id=741 bgcolor=#fefefe
| 249741 ||  || — || September 24, 2000 || Socorro || LINEAR || — || align=right data-sort-value="0.88" | 880 m || 
|-id=742 bgcolor=#fefefe
| 249742 ||  || — || September 24, 2000 || Socorro || LINEAR || — || align=right | 1.2 km || 
|-id=743 bgcolor=#fefefe
| 249743 ||  || — || September 26, 2000 || Socorro || LINEAR || — || align=right data-sort-value="0.98" | 980 m || 
|-id=744 bgcolor=#fefefe
| 249744 ||  || — || September 21, 2000 || Socorro || LINEAR || — || align=right | 1.2 km || 
|-id=745 bgcolor=#fefefe
| 249745 ||  || — || September 21, 2000 || Socorro || LINEAR || FLO || align=right data-sort-value="0.95" | 950 m || 
|-id=746 bgcolor=#fefefe
| 249746 ||  || — || September 24, 2000 || Socorro || LINEAR || — || align=right | 1.1 km || 
|-id=747 bgcolor=#fefefe
| 249747 ||  || — || September 25, 2000 || Socorro || LINEAR || FLO || align=right | 1.3 km || 
|-id=748 bgcolor=#d6d6d6
| 249748 ||  || — || September 27, 2000 || Socorro || LINEAR || — || align=right | 3.1 km || 
|-id=749 bgcolor=#fefefe
| 249749 ||  || — || September 24, 2000 || Socorro || LINEAR || — || align=right data-sort-value="0.97" | 970 m || 
|-id=750 bgcolor=#fefefe
| 249750 ||  || — || September 23, 2000 || Socorro || LINEAR || V || align=right data-sort-value="0.88" | 880 m || 
|-id=751 bgcolor=#d6d6d6
| 249751 ||  || — || September 30, 2000 || Socorro || LINEAR || — || align=right | 5.6 km || 
|-id=752 bgcolor=#fefefe
| 249752 ||  || — || September 30, 2000 || Socorro || LINEAR || FLO || align=right data-sort-value="0.91" | 910 m || 
|-id=753 bgcolor=#fefefe
| 249753 ||  || — || September 30, 2000 || Socorro || LINEAR || FLO || align=right | 1.3 km || 
|-id=754 bgcolor=#fefefe
| 249754 ||  || — || September 29, 2000 || Kitt Peak || Spacewatch || — || align=right | 1.0 km || 
|-id=755 bgcolor=#C2FFFF
| 249755 ||  || — || September 29, 2000 || Anderson Mesa || LONEOS || L5 || align=right | 16 km || 
|-id=756 bgcolor=#fefefe
| 249756 ||  || — || September 23, 2000 || Anderson Mesa || LONEOS || FLO || align=right data-sort-value="0.98" | 980 m || 
|-id=757 bgcolor=#d6d6d6
| 249757 ||  || — || October 1, 2000 || Socorro || LINEAR || TEL || align=right | 1.8 km || 
|-id=758 bgcolor=#fefefe
| 249758 ||  || — || October 1, 2000 || Socorro || LINEAR || FLO || align=right data-sort-value="0.68" | 680 m || 
|-id=759 bgcolor=#d6d6d6
| 249759 ||  || — || October 3, 2000 || Socorro || LINEAR || KOR || align=right | 2.2 km || 
|-id=760 bgcolor=#d6d6d6
| 249760 ||  || — || October 1, 2000 || Socorro || LINEAR || — || align=right | 2.6 km || 
|-id=761 bgcolor=#d6d6d6
| 249761 ||  || — || October 24, 2000 || Socorro || LINEAR || EOS || align=right | 3.2 km || 
|-id=762 bgcolor=#d6d6d6
| 249762 ||  || — || October 24, 2000 || Socorro || LINEAR || — || align=right | 4.6 km || 
|-id=763 bgcolor=#d6d6d6
| 249763 ||  || — || October 25, 2000 || Socorro || LINEAR || — || align=right | 2.9 km || 
|-id=764 bgcolor=#fefefe
| 249764 ||  || — || October 25, 2000 || Socorro || LINEAR || — || align=right | 1.3 km || 
|-id=765 bgcolor=#d6d6d6
| 249765 ||  || — || October 25, 2000 || Socorro || LINEAR || — || align=right | 5.0 km || 
|-id=766 bgcolor=#d6d6d6
| 249766 ||  || — || October 25, 2000 || Socorro || LINEAR || EOS || align=right | 3.0 km || 
|-id=767 bgcolor=#d6d6d6
| 249767 ||  || — || November 1, 2000 || Socorro || LINEAR || TIR || align=right | 4.2 km || 
|-id=768 bgcolor=#fefefe
| 249768 ||  || — || November 1, 2000 || Socorro || LINEAR || — || align=right | 1.4 km || 
|-id=769 bgcolor=#fefefe
| 249769 ||  || — || November 3, 2000 || Socorro || LINEAR || V || align=right | 1.0 km || 
|-id=770 bgcolor=#d6d6d6
| 249770 ||  || — || November 3, 2000 || Socorro || LINEAR || TEL || align=right | 2.5 km || 
|-id=771 bgcolor=#fefefe
| 249771 ||  || — || November 3, 2000 || Socorro || LINEAR || FLO || align=right data-sort-value="0.82" | 820 m || 
|-id=772 bgcolor=#FA8072
| 249772 ||  || — || November 15, 2000 || Socorro || LINEAR || — || align=right | 1.6 km || 
|-id=773 bgcolor=#d6d6d6
| 249773 ||  || — || November 20, 2000 || Socorro || LINEAR || — || align=right | 4.6 km || 
|-id=774 bgcolor=#d6d6d6
| 249774 ||  || — || November 21, 2000 || Socorro || LINEAR || — || align=right | 4.6 km || 
|-id=775 bgcolor=#d6d6d6
| 249775 ||  || — || November 20, 2000 || Socorro || LINEAR || — || align=right | 3.0 km || 
|-id=776 bgcolor=#d6d6d6
| 249776 ||  || — || November 21, 2000 || Socorro || LINEAR || — || align=right | 4.3 km || 
|-id=777 bgcolor=#fefefe
| 249777 ||  || — || November 26, 2000 || Socorro || LINEAR || — || align=right | 1.1 km || 
|-id=778 bgcolor=#d6d6d6
| 249778 ||  || — || November 27, 2000 || Kitt Peak || Spacewatch || — || align=right | 3.1 km || 
|-id=779 bgcolor=#d6d6d6
| 249779 ||  || — || November 26, 2000 || Socorro || LINEAR || — || align=right | 6.0 km || 
|-id=780 bgcolor=#d6d6d6
| 249780 ||  || — || November 20, 2000 || Socorro || LINEAR || — || align=right | 4.2 km || 
|-id=781 bgcolor=#fefefe
| 249781 ||  || — || November 29, 2000 || Socorro || LINEAR || — || align=right | 1.4 km || 
|-id=782 bgcolor=#fefefe
| 249782 ||  || — || November 16, 2000 || Kitt Peak || Spacewatch || — || align=right | 1.2 km || 
|-id=783 bgcolor=#fefefe
| 249783 ||  || — || November 20, 2000 || Socorro || LINEAR || — || align=right | 1.2 km || 
|-id=784 bgcolor=#d6d6d6
| 249784 ||  || — || November 23, 2000 || Haleakala || NEAT || — || align=right | 4.8 km || 
|-id=785 bgcolor=#fefefe
| 249785 ||  || — || November 19, 2000 || Socorro || LINEAR || H || align=right data-sort-value="0.87" | 870 m || 
|-id=786 bgcolor=#d6d6d6
| 249786 ||  || — || November 25, 2000 || Anderson Mesa || LONEOS || — || align=right | 5.3 km || 
|-id=787 bgcolor=#fefefe
| 249787 ||  || — || December 4, 2000 || Socorro || LINEAR || PHO || align=right | 1.7 km || 
|-id=788 bgcolor=#d6d6d6
| 249788 ||  || — || December 6, 2000 || Socorro || LINEAR || EUP || align=right | 5.7 km || 
|-id=789 bgcolor=#d6d6d6
| 249789 ||  || — || December 6, 2000 || Socorro || LINEAR || — || align=right | 6.0 km || 
|-id=790 bgcolor=#d6d6d6
| 249790 ||  || — || December 17, 2000 || Socorro || LINEAR || — || align=right | 5.4 km || 
|-id=791 bgcolor=#fefefe
| 249791 ||  || — || December 19, 2000 || Kitt Peak || Spacewatch || V || align=right data-sort-value="0.86" | 860 m || 
|-id=792 bgcolor=#fefefe
| 249792 ||  || — || December 22, 2000 || Socorro || LINEAR || — || align=right data-sort-value="0.98" | 980 m || 
|-id=793 bgcolor=#fefefe
| 249793 ||  || — || December 23, 2000 || Kitt Peak || Spacewatch || FLO || align=right data-sort-value="0.97" | 970 m || 
|-id=794 bgcolor=#d6d6d6
| 249794 ||  || — || December 28, 2000 || Haleakala || NEAT || — || align=right | 5.7 km || 
|-id=795 bgcolor=#fefefe
| 249795 ||  || — || December 30, 2000 || Socorro || LINEAR || — || align=right | 1.1 km || 
|-id=796 bgcolor=#d6d6d6
| 249796 ||  || — || December 30, 2000 || Socorro || LINEAR || — || align=right | 4.6 km || 
|-id=797 bgcolor=#fefefe
| 249797 ||  || — || December 30, 2000 || Socorro || LINEAR || — || align=right | 1.0 km || 
|-id=798 bgcolor=#fefefe
| 249798 ||  || — || December 30, 2000 || Socorro || LINEAR || FLO || align=right | 1.1 km || 
|-id=799 bgcolor=#FA8072
| 249799 ||  || — || December 30, 2000 || Socorro || LINEAR || — || align=right | 1.5 km || 
|-id=800 bgcolor=#fefefe
| 249800 ||  || — || December 30, 2000 || Socorro || LINEAR || NYS || align=right data-sort-value="0.88" | 880 m || 
|}

249801–249900 

|-bgcolor=#d6d6d6
| 249801 ||  || — || December 30, 2000 || Socorro || LINEAR || — || align=right | 3.2 km || 
|-id=802 bgcolor=#d6d6d6
| 249802 ||  || — || December 27, 2000 || Anderson Mesa || LONEOS || — || align=right | 4.0 km || 
|-id=803 bgcolor=#d6d6d6
| 249803 ||  || — || January 2, 2001 || Socorro || LINEAR || — || align=right | 3.7 km || 
|-id=804 bgcolor=#d6d6d6
| 249804 ||  || — || January 4, 2001 || Socorro || LINEAR || — || align=right | 5.8 km || 
|-id=805 bgcolor=#fefefe
| 249805 ||  || — || January 6, 2001 || Socorro || LINEAR || H || align=right data-sort-value="0.72" | 720 m || 
|-id=806 bgcolor=#fefefe
| 249806 ||  || — || January 20, 2001 || Socorro || LINEAR || NYS || align=right | 2.2 km || 
|-id=807 bgcolor=#d6d6d6
| 249807 ||  || — || January 21, 2001 || Socorro || LINEAR || EUP || align=right | 6.3 km || 
|-id=808 bgcolor=#fefefe
| 249808 ||  || — || January 21, 2001 || Socorro || LINEAR || — || align=right | 1.2 km || 
|-id=809 bgcolor=#d6d6d6
| 249809 ||  || — || February 12, 2001 || Prescott || P. G. Comba || — || align=right | 5.3 km || 
|-id=810 bgcolor=#d6d6d6
| 249810 ||  || — || February 19, 2001 || Socorro || LINEAR || — || align=right | 4.9 km || 
|-id=811 bgcolor=#d6d6d6
| 249811 ||  || — || February 19, 2001 || Socorro || LINEAR || HYG || align=right | 4.8 km || 
|-id=812 bgcolor=#fefefe
| 249812 ||  || — || February 20, 2001 || Socorro || LINEAR || — || align=right | 1.5 km || 
|-id=813 bgcolor=#fefefe
| 249813 ||  || — || February 17, 2001 || Haleakala || NEAT || ERI || align=right | 2.9 km || 
|-id=814 bgcolor=#d6d6d6
| 249814 ||  || — || February 16, 2001 || Socorro || LINEAR || — || align=right | 4.3 km || 
|-id=815 bgcolor=#fefefe
| 249815 ||  || — || March 18, 2001 || Socorro || LINEAR || H || align=right | 1.2 km || 
|-id=816 bgcolor=#FFC2E0
| 249816 ||  || — || March 26, 2001 || Socorro || LINEAR || AMOcritical || align=right data-sort-value="0.54" | 540 m || 
|-id=817 bgcolor=#fefefe
| 249817 ||  || — || March 18, 2001 || Socorro || LINEAR || MAS || align=right data-sort-value="0.97" | 970 m || 
|-id=818 bgcolor=#fefefe
| 249818 ||  || — || March 19, 2001 || Socorro || LINEAR || NYS || align=right data-sort-value="0.93" | 930 m || 
|-id=819 bgcolor=#fefefe
| 249819 ||  || — || March 19, 2001 || Haleakala || NEAT || — || align=right | 1.4 km || 
|-id=820 bgcolor=#FA8072
| 249820 ||  || — || March 24, 2001 || Anderson Mesa || LONEOS || H || align=right | 1.1 km || 
|-id=821 bgcolor=#fefefe
| 249821 ||  || — || March 24, 2001 || Anderson Mesa || LONEOS || — || align=right | 3.1 km || 
|-id=822 bgcolor=#fefefe
| 249822 ||  || — || March 19, 2001 || Socorro || LINEAR || NYS || align=right | 1.1 km || 
|-id=823 bgcolor=#fefefe
| 249823 ||  || — || March 21, 2001 || Kitt Peak || SKADS || — || align=right | 1.2 km || 
|-id=824 bgcolor=#fefefe
| 249824 ||  || — || April 15, 2001 || Socorro || LINEAR || — || align=right | 2.3 km || 
|-id=825 bgcolor=#fefefe
| 249825 ||  || — || April 16, 2001 || Anderson Mesa || LONEOS || — || align=right | 1.6 km || 
|-id=826 bgcolor=#fefefe
| 249826 ||  || — || April 23, 2001 || Socorro || LINEAR || — || align=right | 1.5 km || 
|-id=827 bgcolor=#fefefe
| 249827 ||  || — || May 18, 2001 || Socorro || LINEAR || NYS || align=right | 1.1 km || 
|-id=828 bgcolor=#E9E9E9
| 249828 ||  || — || May 18, 2001 || Socorro || LINEAR || — || align=right | 2.1 km || 
|-id=829 bgcolor=#E9E9E9
| 249829 ||  || — || June 13, 2001 || Anderson Mesa || LONEOS || GER || align=right | 3.0 km || 
|-id=830 bgcolor=#E9E9E9
| 249830 ||  || — || July 20, 2001 || Palomar || NEAT || — || align=right | 2.9 km || 
|-id=831 bgcolor=#E9E9E9
| 249831 ||  || — || July 16, 2001 || Anderson Mesa || LONEOS || — || align=right | 1.7 km || 
|-id=832 bgcolor=#E9E9E9
| 249832 ||  || — || July 20, 2001 || Palomar || NEAT || — || align=right | 3.3 km || 
|-id=833 bgcolor=#E9E9E9
| 249833 ||  || — || July 21, 2001 || Palomar || NEAT || — || align=right | 3.3 km || 
|-id=834 bgcolor=#E9E9E9
| 249834 ||  || — || July 16, 2001 || Haleakala || NEAT || — || align=right | 2.4 km || 
|-id=835 bgcolor=#E9E9E9
| 249835 ||  || — || July 22, 2001 || Anderson Mesa || LONEOS || — || align=right | 3.5 km || 
|-id=836 bgcolor=#E9E9E9
| 249836 ||  || — || July 21, 2001 || Haleakala || NEAT || — || align=right | 2.6 km || 
|-id=837 bgcolor=#E9E9E9
| 249837 ||  || — || July 25, 2001 || Haleakala || NEAT || — || align=right | 3.2 km || 
|-id=838 bgcolor=#E9E9E9
| 249838 ||  || — || July 28, 2001 || Anderson Mesa || LONEOS || slow || align=right | 2.3 km || 
|-id=839 bgcolor=#E9E9E9
| 249839 ||  || — || August 8, 2001 || Haleakala || NEAT || — || align=right | 2.5 km || 
|-id=840 bgcolor=#E9E9E9
| 249840 ||  || — || August 9, 2001 || Palomar || NEAT || — || align=right | 3.9 km || 
|-id=841 bgcolor=#E9E9E9
| 249841 ||  || — || August 10, 2001 || Palomar || NEAT || JUN || align=right | 3.8 km || 
|-id=842 bgcolor=#E9E9E9
| 249842 ||  || — || August 10, 2001 || Palomar || NEAT || — || align=right | 2.1 km || 
|-id=843 bgcolor=#E9E9E9
| 249843 ||  || — || August 10, 2001 || Palomar || NEAT || JUN || align=right | 1.8 km || 
|-id=844 bgcolor=#E9E9E9
| 249844 ||  || — || August 10, 2001 || Palomar || NEAT || — || align=right | 2.5 km || 
|-id=845 bgcolor=#E9E9E9
| 249845 ||  || — || August 14, 2001 || Haleakala || NEAT || — || align=right | 2.3 km || 
|-id=846 bgcolor=#E9E9E9
| 249846 ||  || — || August 13, 2001 || Haleakala || NEAT || — || align=right | 3.8 km || 
|-id=847 bgcolor=#E9E9E9
| 249847 ||  || — || August 14, 2001 || Haleakala || NEAT || CLO || align=right | 3.0 km || 
|-id=848 bgcolor=#E9E9E9
| 249848 ||  || — || August 1, 2001 || Palomar || NEAT || — || align=right | 2.9 km || 
|-id=849 bgcolor=#E9E9E9
| 249849 ||  || — || August 16, 2001 || Socorro || LINEAR || — || align=right | 1.6 km || 
|-id=850 bgcolor=#FA8072
| 249850 ||  || — || August 16, 2001 || Socorro || LINEAR || — || align=right | 2.3 km || 
|-id=851 bgcolor=#E9E9E9
| 249851 ||  || — || August 16, 2001 || Socorro || LINEAR || — || align=right | 2.5 km || 
|-id=852 bgcolor=#E9E9E9
| 249852 ||  || — || August 16, 2001 || Socorro || LINEAR || — || align=right | 2.9 km || 
|-id=853 bgcolor=#E9E9E9
| 249853 ||  || — || August 16, 2001 || Socorro || LINEAR || — || align=right | 2.1 km || 
|-id=854 bgcolor=#E9E9E9
| 249854 ||  || — || August 16, 2001 || Socorro || LINEAR || EUN || align=right | 3.2 km || 
|-id=855 bgcolor=#E9E9E9
| 249855 ||  || — || August 16, 2001 || Socorro || LINEAR || — || align=right | 2.7 km || 
|-id=856 bgcolor=#E9E9E9
| 249856 ||  || — || August 16, 2001 || Socorro || LINEAR || — || align=right | 2.7 km || 
|-id=857 bgcolor=#E9E9E9
| 249857 ||  || — || August 20, 2001 || Socorro || LINEAR || — || align=right | 2.8 km || 
|-id=858 bgcolor=#E9E9E9
| 249858 ||  || — || August 17, 2001 || Socorro || LINEAR || — || align=right | 4.1 km || 
|-id=859 bgcolor=#E9E9E9
| 249859 ||  || — || August 17, 2001 || Socorro || LINEAR || — || align=right | 3.3 km || 
|-id=860 bgcolor=#E9E9E9
| 249860 ||  || — || August 19, 2001 || Socorro || LINEAR || — || align=right | 2.9 km || 
|-id=861 bgcolor=#E9E9E9
| 249861 ||  || — || August 20, 2001 || Socorro || LINEAR || — || align=right | 3.0 km || 
|-id=862 bgcolor=#E9E9E9
| 249862 ||  || — || August 21, 2001 || Socorro || LINEAR || — || align=right | 1.5 km || 
|-id=863 bgcolor=#E9E9E9
| 249863 ||  || — || August 21, 2001 || Socorro || LINEAR || JUN || align=right | 1.7 km || 
|-id=864 bgcolor=#E9E9E9
| 249864 ||  || — || August 23, 2001 || Anderson Mesa || LONEOS || — || align=right | 3.2 km || 
|-id=865 bgcolor=#E9E9E9
| 249865 ||  || — || August 23, 2001 || Anderson Mesa || LONEOS || — || align=right | 2.6 km || 
|-id=866 bgcolor=#E9E9E9
| 249866 ||  || — || August 24, 2001 || Haleakala || NEAT || — || align=right | 2.2 km || 
|-id=867 bgcolor=#E9E9E9
| 249867 ||  || — || August 24, 2001 || Socorro || LINEAR || — || align=right | 2.7 km || 
|-id=868 bgcolor=#E9E9E9
| 249868 ||  || — || August 25, 2001 || Socorro || LINEAR || — || align=right | 1.7 km || 
|-id=869 bgcolor=#E9E9E9
| 249869 ||  || — || August 25, 2001 || Socorro || LINEAR || — || align=right | 3.4 km || 
|-id=870 bgcolor=#E9E9E9
| 249870 ||  || — || August 17, 2001 || Palomar || NEAT || — || align=right | 4.1 km || 
|-id=871 bgcolor=#E9E9E9
| 249871 ||  || — || August 22, 2001 || Goodricke-Pigott || R. A. Tucker || — || align=right | 1.7 km || 
|-id=872 bgcolor=#E9E9E9
| 249872 ||  || — || August 22, 2001 || Kitt Peak || Spacewatch || — || align=right | 2.9 km || 
|-id=873 bgcolor=#E9E9E9
| 249873 ||  || — || August 23, 2001 || Anderson Mesa || LONEOS || JUN || align=right | 1.6 km || 
|-id=874 bgcolor=#E9E9E9
| 249874 ||  || — || August 23, 2001 || Socorro || LINEAR || — || align=right | 3.6 km || 
|-id=875 bgcolor=#E9E9E9
| 249875 ||  || — || August 23, 2001 || Kitt Peak || Spacewatch || — || align=right | 2.3 km || 
|-id=876 bgcolor=#E9E9E9
| 249876 ||  || — || August 23, 2001 || Anderson Mesa || LONEOS || ADE || align=right | 4.3 km || 
|-id=877 bgcolor=#E9E9E9
| 249877 ||  || — || August 24, 2001 || Anderson Mesa || LONEOS || — || align=right | 3.3 km || 
|-id=878 bgcolor=#E9E9E9
| 249878 ||  || — || August 24, 2001 || Socorro || LINEAR || — || align=right | 2.0 km || 
|-id=879 bgcolor=#E9E9E9
| 249879 ||  || — || August 25, 2001 || Socorro || LINEAR || GEF || align=right | 1.5 km || 
|-id=880 bgcolor=#E9E9E9
| 249880 ||  || — || August 20, 2001 || Socorro || LINEAR || — || align=right | 1.6 km || 
|-id=881 bgcolor=#E9E9E9
| 249881 ||  || — || August 19, 2001 || Socorro || LINEAR || — || align=right | 2.5 km || 
|-id=882 bgcolor=#E9E9E9
| 249882 ||  || — || August 19, 2001 || Socorro || LINEAR || — || align=right | 3.8 km || 
|-id=883 bgcolor=#E9E9E9
| 249883 ||  || — || August 19, 2001 || Socorro || LINEAR || — || align=right | 2.9 km || 
|-id=884 bgcolor=#E9E9E9
| 249884 ||  || — || August 17, 2001 || Palomar || NEAT || INO || align=right | 1.7 km || 
|-id=885 bgcolor=#E9E9E9
| 249885 ||  || — || September 10, 2001 || Socorro || LINEAR || GAL || align=right | 1.7 km || 
|-id=886 bgcolor=#FFC2E0
| 249886 ||  || — || September 9, 2001 || Socorro || LINEAR || AMO +1km || align=right | 1.2 km || 
|-id=887 bgcolor=#E9E9E9
| 249887 ||  || — || September 7, 2001 || Socorro || LINEAR || — || align=right | 2.1 km || 
|-id=888 bgcolor=#E9E9E9
| 249888 ||  || — || September 8, 2001 || Socorro || LINEAR || — || align=right | 2.6 km || 
|-id=889 bgcolor=#E9E9E9
| 249889 ||  || — || September 10, 2001 || Desert Eagle || W. K. Y. Yeung || — || align=right | 2.0 km || 
|-id=890 bgcolor=#E9E9E9
| 249890 ||  || — || September 12, 2001 || Socorro || LINEAR || INO || align=right | 2.0 km || 
|-id=891 bgcolor=#E9E9E9
| 249891 ||  || — || September 12, 2001 || Socorro || LINEAR || AEO || align=right | 1.9 km || 
|-id=892 bgcolor=#E9E9E9
| 249892 ||  || — || September 10, 2001 || Socorro || LINEAR || PAE || align=right | 2.5 km || 
|-id=893 bgcolor=#E9E9E9
| 249893 ||  || — || September 10, 2001 || Socorro || LINEAR || — || align=right | 2.1 km || 
|-id=894 bgcolor=#E9E9E9
| 249894 ||  || — || September 11, 2001 || Anderson Mesa || LONEOS || — || align=right | 2.8 km || 
|-id=895 bgcolor=#E9E9E9
| 249895 ||  || — || September 12, 2001 || Socorro || LINEAR || — || align=right | 2.6 km || 
|-id=896 bgcolor=#E9E9E9
| 249896 ||  || — || September 17, 2001 || Goodricke-Pigott || R. A. Tucker || — || align=right | 3.1 km || 
|-id=897 bgcolor=#E9E9E9
| 249897 ||  || — || September 16, 2001 || Socorro || LINEAR || EUN || align=right | 2.3 km || 
|-id=898 bgcolor=#E9E9E9
| 249898 ||  || — || September 16, 2001 || Socorro || LINEAR || — || align=right | 2.5 km || 
|-id=899 bgcolor=#E9E9E9
| 249899 ||  || — || September 16, 2001 || Socorro || LINEAR || — || align=right | 2.8 km || 
|-id=900 bgcolor=#E9E9E9
| 249900 ||  || — || September 17, 2001 || Socorro || LINEAR || — || align=right | 2.8 km || 
|}

249901–250000 

|-bgcolor=#E9E9E9
| 249901 ||  || — || September 20, 2001 || Socorro || LINEAR || — || align=right | 3.1 km || 
|-id=902 bgcolor=#E9E9E9
| 249902 ||  || — || September 20, 2001 || Socorro || LINEAR || — || align=right | 1.9 km || 
|-id=903 bgcolor=#E9E9E9
| 249903 ||  || — || September 20, 2001 || Socorro || LINEAR || — || align=right | 2.8 km || 
|-id=904 bgcolor=#E9E9E9
| 249904 ||  || — || September 20, 2001 || Socorro || LINEAR || AER || align=right | 1.9 km || 
|-id=905 bgcolor=#E9E9E9
| 249905 ||  || — || September 20, 2001 || Socorro || LINEAR || HOF || align=right | 2.9 km || 
|-id=906 bgcolor=#E9E9E9
| 249906 ||  || — || September 20, 2001 || Socorro || LINEAR || — || align=right | 2.0 km || 
|-id=907 bgcolor=#E9E9E9
| 249907 ||  || — || September 20, 2001 || Socorro || LINEAR || AGN || align=right | 1.3 km || 
|-id=908 bgcolor=#E9E9E9
| 249908 ||  || — || September 16, 2001 || Socorro || LINEAR || — || align=right | 2.8 km || 
|-id=909 bgcolor=#E9E9E9
| 249909 ||  || — || September 17, 2001 || Socorro || LINEAR || — || align=right | 3.6 km || 
|-id=910 bgcolor=#E9E9E9
| 249910 ||  || — || September 17, 2001 || Socorro || LINEAR || INO || align=right | 1.8 km || 
|-id=911 bgcolor=#E9E9E9
| 249911 ||  || — || September 19, 2001 || Socorro || LINEAR || CLO || align=right | 3.3 km || 
|-id=912 bgcolor=#E9E9E9
| 249912 ||  || — || September 16, 2001 || Socorro || LINEAR || NEM || align=right | 2.9 km || 
|-id=913 bgcolor=#E9E9E9
| 249913 ||  || — || September 19, 2001 || Socorro || LINEAR || — || align=right | 2.9 km || 
|-id=914 bgcolor=#E9E9E9
| 249914 ||  || — || September 19, 2001 || Socorro || LINEAR || PAD || align=right | 2.6 km || 
|-id=915 bgcolor=#E9E9E9
| 249915 ||  || — || September 19, 2001 || Socorro || LINEAR || AGN || align=right | 1.7 km || 
|-id=916 bgcolor=#E9E9E9
| 249916 ||  || — || September 19, 2001 || Socorro || LINEAR || — || align=right | 3.4 km || 
|-id=917 bgcolor=#E9E9E9
| 249917 ||  || — || September 19, 2001 || Socorro || LINEAR || — || align=right | 2.9 km || 
|-id=918 bgcolor=#E9E9E9
| 249918 ||  || — || September 20, 2001 || Socorro || LINEAR || GEF || align=right | 1.8 km || 
|-id=919 bgcolor=#E9E9E9
| 249919 ||  || — || September 20, 2001 || Socorro || LINEAR || — || align=right | 3.2 km || 
|-id=920 bgcolor=#E9E9E9
| 249920 ||  || — || September 28, 2001 || Palomar || NEAT || — || align=right | 2.0 km || 
|-id=921 bgcolor=#E9E9E9
| 249921 ||  || — || September 16, 2001 || Socorro || LINEAR || HOF || align=right | 3.6 km || 
|-id=922 bgcolor=#E9E9E9
| 249922 ||  || — || September 20, 2001 || Socorro || LINEAR || NEM || align=right | 2.9 km || 
|-id=923 bgcolor=#E9E9E9
| 249923 ||  || — || September 21, 2001 || Socorro || LINEAR || — || align=right | 3.3 km || 
|-id=924 bgcolor=#E9E9E9
| 249924 ||  || — || September 25, 2001 || Socorro || LINEAR || — || align=right | 3.7 km || 
|-id=925 bgcolor=#E9E9E9
| 249925 ||  || — || September 19, 2001 || Kitt Peak || Spacewatch || NEM || align=right | 2.1 km || 
|-id=926 bgcolor=#E9E9E9
| 249926 ||  || — || September 25, 2001 || Palomar || NEAT || — || align=right | 3.7 km || 
|-id=927 bgcolor=#d6d6d6
| 249927 ||  || — || September 25, 2001 || Socorro || LINEAR || — || align=right | 4.6 km || 
|-id=928 bgcolor=#E9E9E9
| 249928 ||  || — || October 7, 2001 || Palomar || NEAT || — || align=right | 2.0 km || 
|-id=929 bgcolor=#E9E9E9
| 249929 ||  || — || October 12, 2001 || Ondřejov || P. Kušnirák, P. Pravec || HOF || align=right | 2.7 km || 
|-id=930 bgcolor=#E9E9E9
| 249930 ||  || — || October 11, 2001 || Socorro || LINEAR || — || align=right | 1.9 km || 
|-id=931 bgcolor=#E9E9E9
| 249931 ||  || — || October 14, 2001 || Socorro || LINEAR || — || align=right | 3.1 km || 
|-id=932 bgcolor=#E9E9E9
| 249932 ||  || — || October 13, 2001 || Socorro || LINEAR || — || align=right | 1.7 km || 
|-id=933 bgcolor=#E9E9E9
| 249933 ||  || — || October 13, 2001 || Socorro || LINEAR || ADE || align=right | 3.3 km || 
|-id=934 bgcolor=#E9E9E9
| 249934 ||  || — || October 14, 2001 || Socorro || LINEAR || — || align=right | 3.8 km || 
|-id=935 bgcolor=#E9E9E9
| 249935 ||  || — || October 14, 2001 || Socorro || LINEAR || GEF || align=right | 2.0 km || 
|-id=936 bgcolor=#E9E9E9
| 249936 ||  || — || October 12, 2001 || Haleakala || NEAT || — || align=right | 3.4 km || 
|-id=937 bgcolor=#E9E9E9
| 249937 ||  || — || October 12, 2001 || Anderson Mesa || LONEOS || GEF || align=right | 1.6 km || 
|-id=938 bgcolor=#E9E9E9
| 249938 ||  || — || October 13, 2001 || Palomar || NEAT || — || align=right | 3.4 km || 
|-id=939 bgcolor=#E9E9E9
| 249939 ||  || — || October 10, 2001 || Palomar || NEAT || — || align=right | 3.2 km || 
|-id=940 bgcolor=#E9E9E9
| 249940 ||  || — || October 15, 2001 || Socorro || LINEAR || — || align=right | 4.2 km || 
|-id=941 bgcolor=#E9E9E9
| 249941 ||  || — || October 15, 2001 || Socorro || LINEAR || — || align=right | 2.4 km || 
|-id=942 bgcolor=#E9E9E9
| 249942 ||  || — || October 15, 2001 || Socorro || LINEAR || — || align=right | 3.0 km || 
|-id=943 bgcolor=#E9E9E9
| 249943 ||  || — || October 14, 2001 || Socorro || LINEAR || — || align=right | 3.3 km || 
|-id=944 bgcolor=#E9E9E9
| 249944 ||  || — || October 14, 2001 || Socorro || LINEAR || — || align=right | 2.8 km || 
|-id=945 bgcolor=#E9E9E9
| 249945 ||  || — || October 14, 2001 || Socorro || LINEAR || — || align=right | 2.9 km || 
|-id=946 bgcolor=#E9E9E9
| 249946 ||  || — || October 14, 2001 || Socorro || LINEAR || — || align=right | 2.9 km || 
|-id=947 bgcolor=#E9E9E9
| 249947 ||  || — || October 15, 2001 || Palomar || NEAT || — || align=right | 3.2 km || 
|-id=948 bgcolor=#E9E9E9
| 249948 ||  || — || October 11, 2001 || Socorro || LINEAR || GEF || align=right | 1.5 km || 
|-id=949 bgcolor=#E9E9E9
| 249949 ||  || — || October 11, 2001 || Socorro || LINEAR || — || align=right | 3.7 km || 
|-id=950 bgcolor=#E9E9E9
| 249950 ||  || — || October 13, 2001 || Anderson Mesa || LONEOS || DOR || align=right | 4.4 km || 
|-id=951 bgcolor=#E9E9E9
| 249951 ||  || — || October 13, 2001 || Palomar || NEAT || — || align=right | 3.5 km || 
|-id=952 bgcolor=#E9E9E9
| 249952 ||  || — || October 14, 2001 || Socorro || LINEAR || — || align=right | 3.4 km || 
|-id=953 bgcolor=#E9E9E9
| 249953 ||  || — || October 15, 2001 || Kitt Peak || Spacewatch || — || align=right | 2.5 km || 
|-id=954 bgcolor=#E9E9E9
| 249954 ||  || — || October 15, 2001 || Palomar || NEAT || — || align=right | 2.9 km || 
|-id=955 bgcolor=#E9E9E9
| 249955 ||  || — || October 15, 2001 || Palomar || NEAT || — || align=right | 3.5 km || 
|-id=956 bgcolor=#E9E9E9
| 249956 ||  || — || October 17, 2001 || Socorro || LINEAR || AGN || align=right | 1.7 km || 
|-id=957 bgcolor=#FA8072
| 249957 ||  || — || October 18, 2001 || Palomar || NEAT || — || align=right | 3.2 km || 
|-id=958 bgcolor=#E9E9E9
| 249958 ||  || — || October 18, 2001 || Socorro || LINEAR || POS || align=right | 5.5 km || 
|-id=959 bgcolor=#E9E9E9
| 249959 ||  || — || October 16, 2001 || Palomar || NEAT || GEF || align=right | 1.6 km || 
|-id=960 bgcolor=#E9E9E9
| 249960 ||  || — || October 17, 2001 || Socorro || LINEAR || AST || align=right | 2.8 km || 
|-id=961 bgcolor=#E9E9E9
| 249961 ||  || — || October 17, 2001 || Socorro || LINEAR || — || align=right | 4.1 km || 
|-id=962 bgcolor=#E9E9E9
| 249962 ||  || — || October 18, 2001 || Socorro || LINEAR || — || align=right | 3.3 km || 
|-id=963 bgcolor=#E9E9E9
| 249963 ||  || — || October 17, 2001 || Kitt Peak || Spacewatch || — || align=right | 3.4 km || 
|-id=964 bgcolor=#E9E9E9
| 249964 ||  || — || October 19, 2001 || Kitt Peak || Spacewatch || HOF || align=right | 2.6 km || 
|-id=965 bgcolor=#E9E9E9
| 249965 ||  || — || October 17, 2001 || Socorro || LINEAR || — || align=right | 2.5 km || 
|-id=966 bgcolor=#E9E9E9
| 249966 ||  || — || October 17, 2001 || Socorro || LINEAR || PAE || align=right | 3.2 km || 
|-id=967 bgcolor=#E9E9E9
| 249967 ||  || — || October 22, 2001 || Socorro || LINEAR || — || align=right | 5.6 km || 
|-id=968 bgcolor=#E9E9E9
| 249968 ||  || — || October 23, 2001 || Palomar || NEAT || — || align=right | 2.8 km || 
|-id=969 bgcolor=#E9E9E9
| 249969 ||  || — || October 21, 2001 || Socorro || LINEAR || PAD || align=right | 3.3 km || 
|-id=970 bgcolor=#E9E9E9
| 249970 ||  || — || October 16, 2001 || Palomar || NEAT || — || align=right | 2.4 km || 
|-id=971 bgcolor=#E9E9E9
| 249971 ||  || — || October 18, 2001 || Socorro || LINEAR || — || align=right | 3.9 km || 
|-id=972 bgcolor=#E9E9E9
| 249972 ||  || — || October 19, 2001 || Palomar || NEAT || — || align=right | 2.7 km || 
|-id=973 bgcolor=#d6d6d6
| 249973 ||  || — || October 26, 2001 || Kitt Peak || Spacewatch || BRA || align=right | 2.2 km || 
|-id=974 bgcolor=#E9E9E9
| 249974 ||  || — || October 17, 2001 || Palomar || NEAT || — || align=right | 2.7 km || 
|-id=975 bgcolor=#E9E9E9
| 249975 ||  || — || November 11, 2001 || Socorro || LINEAR || BRU || align=right | 5.9 km || 
|-id=976 bgcolor=#E9E9E9
| 249976 ||  || — || November 9, 2001 || Socorro || LINEAR || — || align=right | 3.4 km || 
|-id=977 bgcolor=#E9E9E9
| 249977 ||  || — || November 9, 2001 || Socorro || LINEAR || — || align=right | 4.2 km || 
|-id=978 bgcolor=#E9E9E9
| 249978 ||  || — || November 10, 2001 || Socorro || LINEAR || DOR || align=right | 4.0 km || 
|-id=979 bgcolor=#E9E9E9
| 249979 ||  || — || November 10, 2001 || Socorro || LINEAR || — || align=right | 4.9 km || 
|-id=980 bgcolor=#E9E9E9
| 249980 ||  || — || November 15, 2001 || Kitt Peak || Spacewatch || — || align=right | 3.4 km || 
|-id=981 bgcolor=#E9E9E9
| 249981 ||  || — || November 12, 2001 || Socorro || LINEAR || — || align=right | 3.5 km || 
|-id=982 bgcolor=#E9E9E9
| 249982 ||  || — || November 12, 2001 || Socorro || LINEAR || — || align=right | 2.0 km || 
|-id=983 bgcolor=#d6d6d6
| 249983 ||  || — || November 12, 2001 || Socorro || LINEAR || EOS || align=right | 3.2 km || 
|-id=984 bgcolor=#E9E9E9
| 249984 ||  || — || November 17, 2001 || Socorro || LINEAR || — || align=right | 3.2 km || 
|-id=985 bgcolor=#E9E9E9
| 249985 ||  || — || November 17, 2001 || Kitt Peak || Spacewatch || AGN || align=right | 1.4 km || 
|-id=986 bgcolor=#d6d6d6
| 249986 ||  || — || November 17, 2001 || Socorro || LINEAR || — || align=right | 3.8 km || 
|-id=987 bgcolor=#E9E9E9
| 249987 ||  || — || November 19, 2001 || Socorro || LINEAR || — || align=right | 2.7 km || 
|-id=988 bgcolor=#d6d6d6
| 249988 ||  || — || November 19, 2001 || Socorro || LINEAR || KOR || align=right | 1.8 km || 
|-id=989 bgcolor=#E9E9E9
| 249989 ||  || — || December 9, 2001 || Socorro || LINEAR || INO || align=right | 1.7 km || 
|-id=990 bgcolor=#E9E9E9
| 249990 ||  || — || December 10, 2001 || Socorro || LINEAR || — || align=right | 3.0 km || 
|-id=991 bgcolor=#d6d6d6
| 249991 ||  || — || December 10, 2001 || Socorro || LINEAR || — || align=right | 3.9 km || 
|-id=992 bgcolor=#d6d6d6
| 249992 ||  || — || December 10, 2001 || Socorro || LINEAR || CHA || align=right | 2.6 km || 
|-id=993 bgcolor=#E9E9E9
| 249993 ||  || — || December 10, 2001 || Socorro || LINEAR || AGN || align=right | 1.4 km || 
|-id=994 bgcolor=#E9E9E9
| 249994 ||  || — || December 11, 2001 || Socorro || LINEAR || — || align=right | 3.7 km || 
|-id=995 bgcolor=#C2FFFF
| 249995 ||  || — || December 14, 2001 || Socorro || LINEAR || L5 || align=right | 16 km || 
|-id=996 bgcolor=#E9E9E9
| 249996 ||  || — || December 14, 2001 || Socorro || LINEAR || — || align=right | 4.2 km || 
|-id=997 bgcolor=#E9E9E9
| 249997 ||  || — || December 11, 2001 || Socorro || LINEAR || MRX || align=right | 1.3 km || 
|-id=998 bgcolor=#E9E9E9
| 249998 ||  || — || December 11, 2001 || Socorro || LINEAR || — || align=right | 3.2 km || 
|-id=999 bgcolor=#E9E9E9
| 249999 ||  || — || December 15, 2001 || Socorro || LINEAR || — || align=right | 2.6 km || 
|-id=000 bgcolor=#d6d6d6
| 250000 ||  || — || December 14, 2001 || Socorro || LINEAR || — || align=right | 4.3 km || 
|}

References

External links 
 Discovery Circumstances: Numbered Minor Planets (245001)–(250000) (IAU Minor Planet Center)

0249